= List of inventions in the medieval Islamic world =

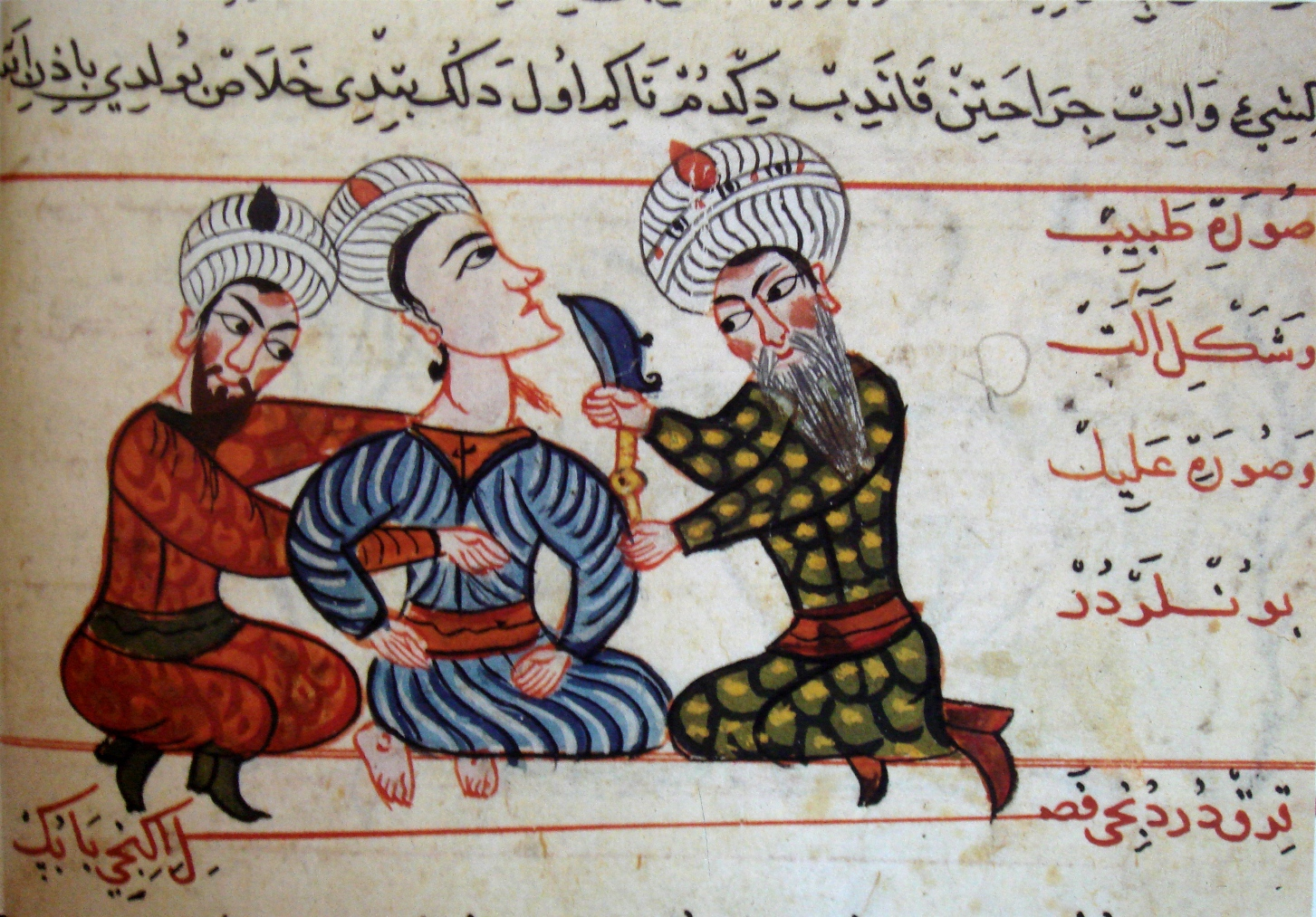
Physicians employing a surgical method. From Şerafeddin Sabuncuoğlu's Imperial Surgery (1465).

The following is a list of inventions, discoveries and scientific advancements made in the medieval Islamic world, especially during the Islamic Golden Age, as well as in later states of the Age of the Islamic Gunpowder Empires such as the Ottoman and Mughal empires.

The Islamic Golden Age was a period of cultural, economic and scientific flourishing in the history of Islam, traditionally dated from the eighth century to the fourteenth century, with several contemporary scholars dating the end of the era to the fifteenth or sixteenth century. This period is traditionally understood to have begun during the reign of the Abbasid caliph Harun al-Rashid (786 to 809) with the inauguration of the House of Wisdom in Baghdad, where scholars from various parts of the world with different cultural backgrounds were mandated to gather and translate all of the world's classical knowledge into the Arabic language and subsequently development in various fields of sciences began. Science and technology in the Islamic world adopted and preserved knowledge and technologies from contemporary and earlier civilizations, including Persia, Egypt, India, China, and Greco-Roman antiquity, while making numerous improvements, innovations and inventions.

== List of inventions ==
=== Early caliphates ===
==== Seventh century ====
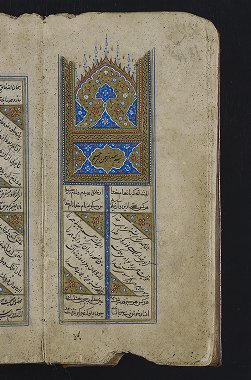
An illustrated headpiece from a mid-18th-century collection of ghazals and rubāʻīyāt, from the University of Pennsylvania library's Lawrence J. Schoenberg Collection

- Ghazal: A form of Islamic poetry that originated from the Arabian Peninsula in the late 7th century.

==== Eighth century ====
- Arabesque: The distinctive Arabesque style was developed by the 11th century, having begun in the 8th or 9th century in works like the Mshatta Facade.
- Astrolabe with angular scale : The astrolabe, originally invented some time between 200 and 150 BC, was further developed in the medieval Islamic world, where Muslim astronomers introduced angular scales to the design, adding circles indicating azimuths on the horizon.
- Classification of chemical substances: The works attributed to Jabir ibn Hayyan (written c. 850–950), and those of Muhammad ibn Zakariya al-Razi (c. 865–925), contain the earliest known classifications of chemical substances.
- Damascus steel: Damascus blades were first manufactured in the Near East from ingots of Wootz steel that were imported from India.
- Modern Oud: Although string instruments existed before Islam, the oud was developed in Islamic music and was the ancestor of the European lute.
- Sulfur-mercury theory of metals: First attested in pseudo-Apollonius of Tyana's Sirr al-khalīqa ("The Secret of Creation", c. 750–850) and in the works attributed to Jabir ibn Hayyan (written c. 850–950), the sulfur-mercury theory of metals would remain the basis of all theories of metallic composition until the eighteenth century.
- Tin-glazing: The earliest tin-glazed pottery appears to have been made in Abbasid Iraq/Mesopotamia in the 8th-century. The oldest fragments found to-date were excavated from the palace of Samarra about 80 kilometres (50 miles) north of Baghdad.
- Panemone windmill: The earliest recorded windmill design found was Persian in origin, and was invented around the 7th-9th centuries.

==== Ninth century ====
- Algebra discipline: Al-Khwarizmi is considered the father of the algebra discipline. The word Algebra comes from the Arabic الجبر (al-jabr) in the title of his book Ilm al-jabr wa'l-muḳābala. He was the first to treat algebra as an independent discipline in its own right.
- Algebraic reduction and balancing, cancellation, and like terms: Al-Khwarizmi introduced reduction and balancing in algebra. It refers to the transposition of subtracted terms to the other side of an equation, that is, the cancellation of like terms on opposite sides of the equation, which the term al-jabr (algebra) originally referred to.
- Automatic controls: "Although the Banu Musa took Greek models as their starting point, they went well beyond anything achieved by Hero or Philo. In particular, it is their preoccupation with automatic controls that distinguishes them not only from their Greek predecessors but from their Islamic successors."
- Chemical synthesis of a naturally occurring compound: The oldest known instructions for deriving an inorganic compound (sal ammoniac or ammonium chloride) from organic substances (such as plants, blood, and hair) by chemical means appear in the works attributed to Jabir ibn Hayyan (written c. 850–950).
- Chess manual: The oldest known chess manual was in Arabic and dates to 840–850, written by Al-Adli ar-Rumi (800–870), a renowned Arab chess player, titled Kitab ash-shatranj (Book of Chess). During the Islamic Golden Age, many works on shatranj were written, recording for the first time the analysis of opening moves, game problems, the knight's tour, and many more subjects common in modern chess books.
- Automatic crank: The non-manual crank appears in several of the hydraulic devices described by the Banū Mūsā brothers in their Book of Ingenious Devices. These automatically operated cranks appear in several devices, two of which contain an action which approximates to that of a crankshaft, anticipating Al-Jazari's invention by several centuries and its first appearance in Europe by over five centuries. However, the automatic crank described by the Banu Musa would not have allowed a full rotation, but only a small modification was required to convert it to a crankshaft.
- Conical valve: A mechanism developed by the Banu Musa, of particular importance for future developments, was the conical valve, which was used in a variety of different applications.
- Cryptanalysis and frequency analysis: In cryptology, the first known recorded explanation of cryptanalysis was given by Al-Kindi (also known as "Alkindus" in Europe), in A Manuscript on Deciphering Cryptographic Messages. This treatise includes the first description of the method of frequency analysis.
- Double-seat valve: It was invented by the Banu Musa, and has a modern appearance in their Book of Ingenious Devices.
- Lusterware: Lustre glazes were applied to pottery in Mesopotamia in the 9th century; the technique soon became popular in Persia and Syria. Earlier uses of lustre are known.
- Mental institute: In 872, Ahmad ibn Tulun built a hospital in Cairo that provided care to the insane, which included music therapy.
- Kerosene distillation: Although the Chinese made use of kerosene through extracting and purifying petroleum, the process of distilling crude oil/petroleum into kerosene, as well as other hydrocarbon compounds, was first written about in the 9th century by the Persian scholar Rāzi (or Rhazes). In his Kitab al-Asrar (Book of Secrets), the physician and chemist Razi described two methods for the production of kerosene, termed naft abyad ("white naphtha"), using an apparatus called an alembic.
- Kerosene lamp: The first description of a simple lamp using crude mineral oil was provided by Persian alchemist al-Razi (Rhazes) in 9th century Baghdad, who referred to it as the "naffatah" in his Kitab al-Asrar (Book of Secrets).
- Minaret: The first known minarets appeared in the early 9th century under Abbasid rule.
- Music sequencer and mechanical musical instrument: The origin of automatic musical instruments dates back to the 9th century, when Persian inventors Banū Mūsā brothers invented a hydropowered organ using exchangeable cylinders with pins, and also an automatic flute playing machine using steam power. These were the earliest mechanical musical instruments, and the first programmable music sequencers.
- Kamal: The kamal originated with Arab navigators of the late 9th century. The invention of the kamal allowed for the earliest known latitude sailing, and was thus the earliest step towards the use of quantitative methods in navigation.
- Programmable machine and automatic flute player: The Banū Mūsā brothers invented a programmable automatic flute player and which they described in their Book of Ingenious Devices. It was the earliest programmable machine.
- Sharbat and soft drink: In the medieval Middle East, a variety of fruit-flavoured soft drinks were widely drunk, such as sharbat, and were often sweetened with ingredients such as sugar, syrup and honey. Other common ingredients included lemon, apple, pomegranate, tamarind, jujube, sumac, musk, mint and ice. Middle Eastern drinks later became popular in medieval Europe, where the word "syrup" was derived from Arabic.
- Sine quadrant: A type of quadrant used by medieval Arabic astronomers, it was described by Muhammad ibn Mūsā al-Khwārizmī in 9th century Baghdad.
- Scimitar: The curved sword or "scimitar" was widespread throughout the Middle East from at least the Ottoman period, with early examples dating to Abbasid era (9th century) Khurasan.
- Sugar mill: Sugar mills first appeared in the medieval Islamic world. They were first driven by watermills, and then windmills from the 9th and 10th centuries in what are today Afghanistan, Pakistan and Iran.
- Systemic algebraic solution and completing the square: Al-Khwarizmi's popularizing treatise on algebra (The Compendious Book on Calculation by Completion and Balancing, c. 813–833 CE) presented the first systematic solution of linear and quadratic equations. One of his principal achievements in algebra was his demonstration of how to solve quadratic equations by completing the square, for which he provided geometric justifications.
- Thabit numbers: Named after Thabit ibn Qurra
- Throttling valve: It appears for the first time in the Banu Musa's Book of Ingenious Devices.
- Variable structure control: Two-step level controls for fluids, a form of discontinuous variable structure controls, was developed by the Banu Musa brothers.
- Wind-powered gristmill: The first wind-powered gristmills were built in the 9th and 10th centuries in what are now Afghanistan, Pakistan and Iran.
- Windpump: Windpumps were used to pump water since at least the 9th century in what is now Afghanistan, Iran and Pakistan.

==== Tenth century ====
- Alhazen's problem: A theorem by ibn al-Haytham solved only in 1997 by Neumann.
- Arabic numerals: The modern Arabic numeral symbols originate from Islamic North Africa in the 10th century. A distinctive Western Arabic variant of the Eastern Arabic numerals began to emerge around the 10th century in the Maghreb and Al-Andalus (sometimes called ghubar numerals, though the term is not always accepted), which are the direct ancestor of the modern Arabic numerals used throughout the world.
- Binomial theorem: The first formulation of the binomial theorem and the table of binomial coefficient can be found in a work by Al-Karaji, quoted by Al-Samaw'al in his "al-Bahir".
- Decimal fractions: Decimal fractions were first used by Abu'l-Hasan al-Uqlidisi in the 10th century.
- Fountain pen: An early historical mention of what appears to be a reservoir pen dates back to the 10th century. According to Ali Abuzar Mari (d. 974) in his Kitab al-Majalis wa 'l-musayarat, the Fatimid caliph Al-Mu'izz li-Din Allah demanded a pen that would not stain his hands or clothes, and was provided with a pen that held ink in a reservoir, allowing it to be held upside-down without leaking.
- Law of cotangents: This was first given by Ibn al-Haytham.
- Muqarnas: The origin of the muqarnas can be traced back to the mid-tenth century in northeastern Iran and central North Africa, as well as the Mesopotamian region.
- Pascal's triangle: The Persian mathematician Al-Karaji (953–1029) wrote a now lost book which contained the description of Pascal's triangle.
- Sextant and mural instrument: The first known mural sextant was constructed in Ray, Iran, by Abu-Mahmud al-Khujandi in 994.
- Shale oil extraction: In the 10th century, the Arab physician Masawaih al-Mardini (Mesue the Younger) described a method of extraction of oil from "some kind of bituminous shale".
- Snell's law: The law was first accurately described by the Persian scientist Ibn Sahl at the Baghdad court in 984. In the manuscript On Burning Mirrors and Lenses, ibn Sahl used the law to derive lens shapes that focus light with no geometric aberrations. According to Jim al-Khalili, the law should be called ibn Sahl's law.
- Vertical-axle windmill: A small wind wheel operating an organ is described as early as the 1st century AD by Hero of Alexandria. The first vertical-axle windmills were eventually built in Sistan, Persia as described by Muslim geographers. These windmills had long vertical driveshafts with rectangle shaped blades. They may have been constructed as early as the time of the second Rashidun caliph Umar (634-644 AD), though some argue that this account may have been a 10th-century amendment. Made of six to twelve sails covered in reed matting or cloth material, these windmills were used to grind grains and draw up water, and used in the gristmilling and sugarcane industries. Horizontal axle windmills of the type generally used today, however, were developed in Northwestern Europe in the 1180s.

==== Eleventh-twelfth centuries ====
- Drug trial: Persian physician Avicenna, in The Canon of Medicine (1025), first described use of clinical trials for determining the efficacy of medical drugs and substances.
- Double-entry bookkeeping system: Double-entry bookkeeping was pioneered in the Jewish community of the medieval Middle East.
- Hyperbolic geometry: The theorems of Ibn al-Haytham (Alhacen), Omar Khayyám and Nasīr al-Dīn al-Tūsī on quadrilaterals were the first theorems on hyperbolic geometry.
- Magnifying glass and convex lens: A convex lens used for forming a magnified image was described in the Book of Optics by Ibn al-Haytham in 1021.
- Mechanical flywheel: The mechanical flywheel, used to smooth out the delivery of power from a driving device to a driven machine and, essentially, to allow lifting water from far greater depths (up to 200 metres), was first employed by Ibn Bassal (fl. 1038–1075), of Al-Andalus.
- Mercuric chloride (formerly corrosive sublimate): used to disinfect wounds.
- Weight-driven clock: Arabic engineers invented water clocks driven by gears and weights in the 11th century.
- Optic chiasm: The crossing of nerve fibres, and the impact on vision that this had, was first clearly identified by Persian physician "Esmail Jorjani", who appears to be Zayn al-Din Gorgani (1042–1137). The optic chiasm was earlier theorized by Ibn al-Haytham in the early 11th century.
- Paper packaging: The earliest recorded use of paper for packaging dates back to 1035, when a Persian traveler visiting markets in Cairo noted that vegetables, spices and hardware were wrapped in paper for the customers after they were sold.
- Bridge mill: The bridge mill was a unique type of watermill that was built as part of the superstructure of a bridge. The earliest record of a bridge mill is from Córdoba, Spain in the 12th century.

==== Thirteenth century ====
- Fritware: It refers to a type of pottery which was first developed in the Near East, beginning in the late 1st millennium, for which frit was a significant ingredient. A recipe for "fritware" dating to c. 1300 AD written by Abu’l Qasim reports that the ratio of quartz to "frit-glass" to white clay is 10:1:1. This type of pottery has also been referred to as "stonepaste" and "faience" among other names. A 9th-century corpus of "proto-stonepaste" from Baghdad has "relict glass fragments" in its fabric.
- Mercury clock: A detailed account of technology in Islamic Spain was compiled under Alfonso X of Castile between 1276 and 1279, which included a compartmented mercury clock, which was influential up until the 17th century. It was described in the Libros del saber de Astronomia, a Spanish work from 1277 consisting of translations and paraphrases of Arabic works.
- Mariotte's bottle: The Libros del saber de Astronomia describes a water clock which employs the principle of Mariotte's bottle.
- Metabolism: Although Greek philosophers described processes of metabolism, Ibn al-Nafees is the first scholar to describe metabolism as "a continuous state of dissolution and nourishment".
- Naker: Arabic nakers were the direct ancestors of most timpani, brought to 13th-century Continental Europe by Crusaders and Saracens.

=== Al Andalus (Islamic Spain) ===
==== Ninth-twelfth centuries ====
- Inheritance of hemophilia: First proposed by Abu Al-Zahrawi was first to record and suggest that hemophilia was an inherited disease.
- Anesthetic sponge: Invented by al-Zahrawi and Ibn Zuhr. Used a sponge soaked with narcotic drugs and placed it on patient's face. These Muslim physicians were the first to use an anesthetic sponge.
- Lithotrite: Improved version invented by Al-Zahrawi.
- Mercuric oxide: First synthesized by Abu al-Qasim al-Qurtubi al-Majriti (10th century).
- Migraine surgery: First performed by al-Zahrawi (936–1013).
- Early Kocher's method and Walter position: Al-Zahrawi's Kitab al-Tasrif described both what would later become known as "Kocher's method" for treating a dislocated shoulder and the "Walcher position" in obstetrics.
- Treatment of wart: al-Zahrawi first described it.
- Treatment of hydrocephalus: First done by Al-Zahrawi.
- Water and weight driven mechanical clocks: By Spanish Muslim engineers sometime between 900 and 1200. According to historian Will Durant, a watch-like device was invented by Ibn Firnas.
- Andalusian Oud: Abu l-Hasan ‘Ali Ibn Nafi‘ (789–857), a prominent musician who had trained under Ishaq al-Mawsili (d. 850) in Baghdad and was exiled to Andalusia before 833 AD. He has been credited with adding a fifth string to his oud and with establishing one of the first schools of music in Córdoba.

==== Fourteenth century ====
- Hispano-Moresque ware: This was a style of Islamic pottery created in Arab Spain, after the Moors had introduced two ceramic techniques to Europe: glazing with an opaque white tin-glaze, and painting in metallic lusters. Hispano-Moresque ware was distinguished from the pottery of Christendom by the Islamic character of its decoration.
- Polar-axis sundial: Early sundials were nodus-based with straight hour-lines, indicating unequal hours (also called temporary hours) that varied with the seasons, since every day was divided into twelve equal segments; thus, hours were shorter in winter and longer in summer. The idea of using hours of equal time length throughout the year was the innovation of Abu'l-Hasan Ibn al-Shatir in 1371, based on earlier developments in trigonometry by Muhammad ibn Jābir al-Harrānī al-Battānī (Albategni). Ibn al-Shatir was aware that "using a gnomon that is parallel to the Earth's axis will produce sundials whose hour lines indicate equal hours on any day of the year." His sundial is the oldest polar-axis sundial still in existence. The concept later appeared in Western sundials from at least 1446.

=== Sultanates ===
==== Twelfth century ====
- Blood measurement device: Created by Al-Jazari

==== Thirteenth century ====
- Various automatons: Al-Jazari's inventions included automaton peacocks, a hand-washing automaton, and a musical band of automatons.
- Candle clock with dial and fastening mechanism: The earliest reference of the candle clock is described in a Chinese poem by You Jiangu (AD 520), However the most sophisticated candle clocks known, were those of Al-Jazari in 1206.
- Crank-slider: Ismail al-Jazari's water pump employed the first known crank-slider mechanism.
- Cotton gin with worm gear: The worm gear roller gin was invented in the Delhi Sultanate during the 13th to 14th centuries.
- Design and construction methods: English technology historian Donald Hill wrote, "We see for the first time in al-Jazari's work several concepts important for both design and construction: the lamination of timber to minimize warping, the static balancing of wheels, the use of wooden templates (a kind of pattern), the use of paper models to establish designs, the calibration of orifices, the grinding of the seats and plugs of valves together with emery powder to obtain a watertight fit, and the casting of metals in closed mold boxes with sand."
- Draw bar: The draw bar was applied to sugar-milling, with evidence of its use at Delhi in the Mughal Empire by 1540, but possibly dating back several centuries earlier to the Delhi Sultanate.
- Minimising intermittence: The concept of minimising the intermittence is first implied in one of Al-Jazari's saqiya devices, which was to maximise the efficiency of the saqiya.
- Programmable automaton and drum machine: The earliest programmable automata, and the first programmable drum machine, were invented by Al-Jazari, and described in The Book of Knowledge of Ingenious Mechanical Devices, written in 1206. His programmable musical device featured four automaton musicians, including two drummers, that floated on a lake to entertain guests at royal drinking parties. It was a programmable drum machine where pegs (cams) bump into little levers that operated the percussion. The drummers could be made to play different rhythms and different drum patterns if the pegs were moved around.
- Tusi couple: The couple was first proposed by Nasir al-Din al-Tusi in his 1247 Tahrir al-Majisti (Commentary on the Almagest) as a solution for the latitudinal motion of the inferior planets. The Tusi couple is explicitly two circles of radii x and 2x in which the circle with the smaller radii rotates inside the Bigger circle. The oscillatory motion be produced by the combined uniform circular motions of two identical circles, one riding on the circumference of the other.
- Griot: The griot musical tradition originates from the Islamic Mali Empire, where the first professional griot was Balla Fasséké.
- Sitar: According to various sources, the sitar was invented by Amir Khusrow, a famous Sufi inventor, poet, and pioneer of Khyal, Tarana and Qawwali, in the Delhi Sultanate. Others say that the instrument was brought from Iran and modified for the tastes of the rulers of the Delhi Sultanate and Mughal Empire.

==== Fourteenth century ====
- Cotton gin with crank handle: The incorporation of the crank handle in the cotton gin, first appeared in either the late Delhi Sultanate or the early Mughal Empire.

==== Fifteenth century ====
- Coffee: Although there are early historical accounts of coffee consumption (as qahwa) in Ethiopia, it is not clear whether it was "used" as a beverage. The earliest historical evidence of coffee drinking appears in the middle of the 15th century, in the Sufi monasteries of the Yemen in southern Arabia. From Mocha, coffee spread to Egypt and North Africa, and by the 16th century, it had reached the rest of the Middle East, Persia and Turkey. From the Muslim world, coffee drinking spread to Italy, then to the rest of Europe, and coffee plants were transported by the Dutch to the East Indies and to the Americas.

=== Ottoman Empire ===
==== Fifteenth century ====
- Iznik pottery: Produced in Ottoman Turkey as early as the 15th century AD. It consists of a body, slip, and glaze, where the body and glaze are "quartz-frit." The "frits" in both cases "are unusual in that they contain lead oxide as well as soda"; the lead oxide would help reduce the thermal expansion coefficient of the ceramic. Microscopic analysis reveals that the material that has been labeled "frit" is "interstitial glass" which serves to connect the quartz particles.
- Standing army with firearms: The Ottoman military's regularized use of firearms proceeded ahead of the pace of their European counterparts. The Janissaries had been an infantry bodyguard using bows and arrows. During the rule of Sultan Mehmed II they were drilled with firearms and became "the first standing infantry force equipped with firearms in the world."

==== Sixteenth century ====
- Firearm kneeling position: At the Battle of Mohács in 1526, the Janissaries equipped with 2000 tüfenks (usually translated as musket) "formed nine consecutive rows and they fired their weapons row by row," in a "kneeling or standing position without the need for additional support or rest." The Chinese later adopted the Ottoman kneeling position for firing.
- Marching band and military band: The marching band and military band both have their origins in the Ottoman military band, performed by the Janissary since the 16th century.
- Matchlock volley fire: Volley fire with matchlocks was first implemented in 1526 when the Ottoman Janissaries utilized it during the Battle of Mohács.
- Parallel rulers: Invented by Taqi ad-Din Muhammad ibn Ma'ruf and used at the Constantinople Observatory of Taqi ad-Din (1577–1580).
- Practical impulse steam turbine: A practical impulse steam turbine was first described in 1551 by Taqi al-Din, a philosopher, astronomer and engineer in 16th century Ottoman Egypt, who described a method for rotating a spit by means of a jet of steam playing on rotary vanes around the periphery of a wheel. A similar device for rotating a spit was also later described by John Wilkins in 1648.
- Steam jack: A steam-powered roasting jack was first described by the Ottoman polymath and engineer Taqi al-Din in his Al-Turuq al-samiyya fi al-alat al-ruhaniyya (The Sublime Methods of Spiritual Machines), in 1551 CE (959 AH). It was an impulse steam turbine with practical applications as a prime mover for rotating a spit, predating Giovanni Branca's later impulse steam turbine from 1629.

=== Safavid dynasty ===
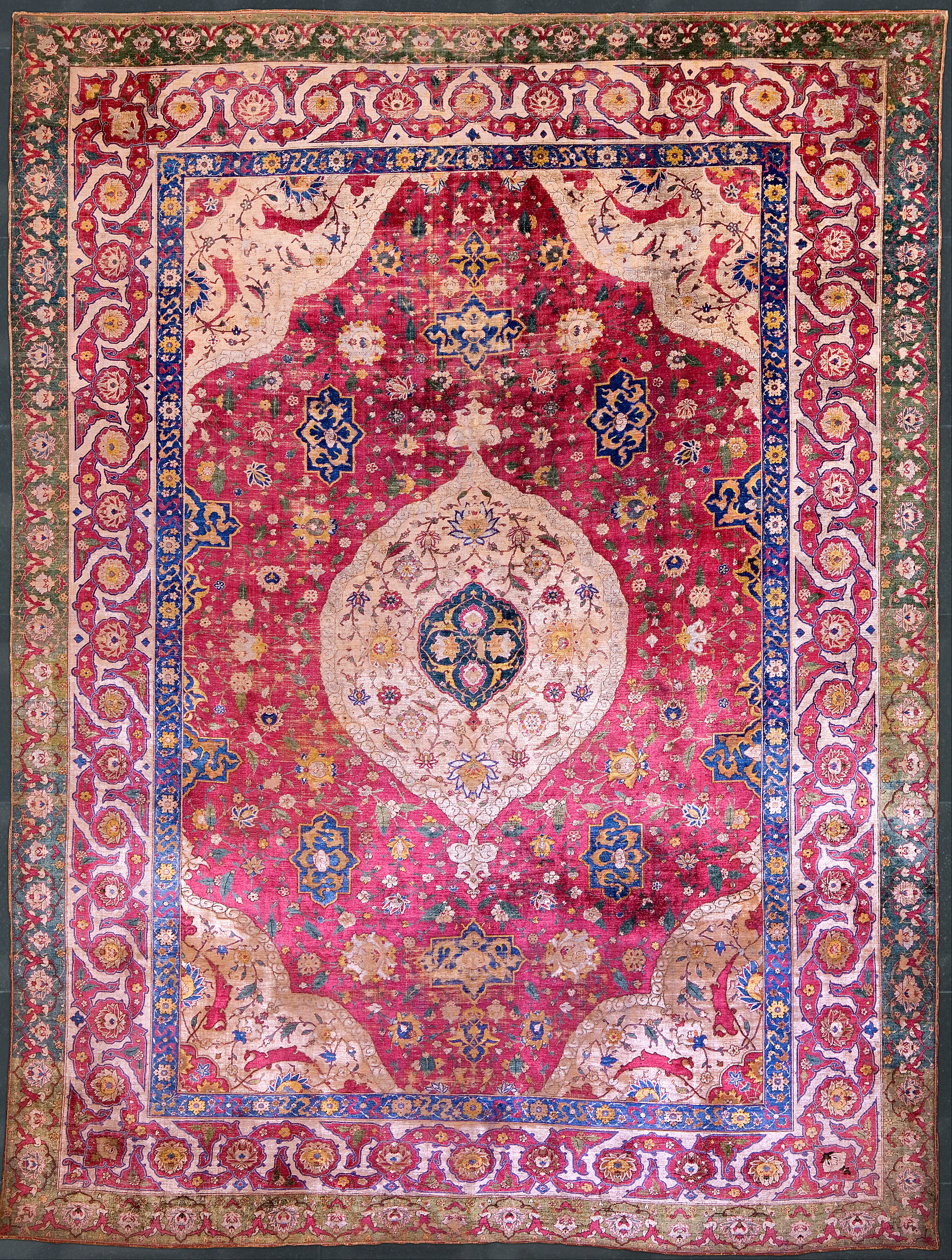
The Rothschild Small Silk Medallion Carpet, mid-16th century, Museum of Islamic Art, Doha

==== Fifteenth century ====
- Classical Oriental carpet: By the late fifteenth century, the design of Persian carpets changed considerably. Large-format medallions appeared, ornaments began to show elaborate curvilinear designs. Large spirals and tendrils, floral ornaments, depictions of flowers and animals, were often mirrored along the long or short axis of the carpet to obtain harmony and rhythm. The earlier "kufic" border design was replaced by tendrils and arabesques. All these patterns required a more elaborate system of weaving, as compared to weaving straight, rectilinear lines. Likewise, they require artists to create the design, weavers to execute them on the loom, and an efficient way to communicate the artist's ideas to the weaver. Today this is achieved by a template, termed cartoon (Ford, 1981, p. 170). How Safavid manufacturers achieved this, technically, is currently unknown. The result of their work, however, was what Kurt Erdmann termed the "carpet design revolution". Apparently, the new designs were developed first by miniature painters, as they started to appear in book illuminations and on book covers as early as in the fifteenth century. This marks the first time when the "classical" design of Islamic rugs was established.

=== Mughal Empire ===
==== Sixteenth century ====
- Hookah or water pipe: according to Cyril Elgood (PP.41, 110), the physician Irfan Shaikh, at the court of the Mughal emperor Akbar I (1542–1605) invented the Hookah or water pipe used most commonly for smoking tobacco.
- Metal cylinder rocket: In the 16th century, Akbar was the first to initiate and use metal cylinder rockets known as bans, particularly against war elephants, during the Battle of Sanbal.
- Multi-barrel matchlock volley gun: Fathullah Shirazi (c. 1582), a Persian polymath and mechanical engineer who worked for Akbar, developed an early multi-shot gun. Shirazi's gun had multiple gun barrels that fired hand cannons loaded with gunpowder. It may be considered a version of a volley gun. One such gun he developed was a seventeen-barrelled cannon fired with a matchlock.

==== Seventeenth century ====
- Roller mill: Sugar rolling mills first appeared in the Mughal Empire, using the principle of rollers as well as worm gearing, by the 17th century.

==== Eighteenth century ====
- Mysorean rockets – One of the first iron-cased rockets were deployed by Hyder Ali's army, ruler of the South Indian Kingdom of Mysore.
- Rocket artillery - The first true rocket artillery was developed by Tipu Sultan and was notably in use during the Anglo-Mysore Wars.

== See also ==
- Timeline of science and engineering in the Islamic world
- Science in the medieval Islamic world
- Islamic attitudes towards science
- Medicine in the medieval Islamic world
- Islamic arts
- Islamic economics
- Islamic literature
- Islamic philosophy
- Islamic technology
  - Islamic pottery
  - Arab Agricultural Revolution
- Gunpowder empires
  - Mughal Empire
  - Science and technology in the Ottoman Empire
  - Safavid dynasty

== Sources ==
- Rashed, Roshdi; Morelon, Régis (1996), Encyclopedia of the History of Arabic Science, Routledge, ISBN 0-415-12410-7
