= Candle clock =

Way of measuring time using a burning candle

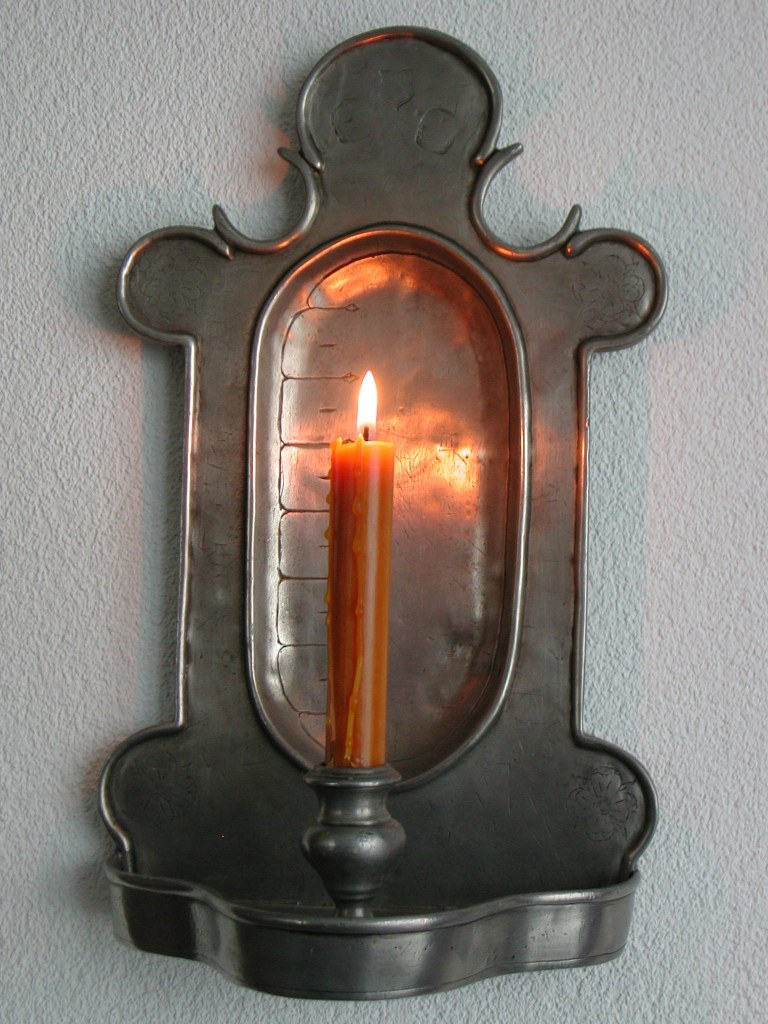
An example of a German candle clock

A candle clock is a thin candle with consistently spaced marking that, when burned, indicates the passage of periods of time. While no longer used today, candle clocks provided an effective way to tell time indoors, at night, or on a cloudy day.

== History ==
It is unknown where and when candle clocks were first used. The earliest reference to their use to occurs in a Chinese poem by You Jiangu (AD 520). Here, the graduated candle supplied a means of determining time at night. Similar candles were used in Japan until the early 10th century.

You Jiangu's device consisted of six candles made from 72 pennyweights (24 grains each), of wax, each being 12 inches high, of uniform thickness, and divided into 12 sections each of one inch. Each candle burned away completely in four hours, making each marking 20 minutes. The candles were placed for protection inside cases made of a wooden frame with transparent horn panels in the sides.

Similar methods of measuring time were used in medieval churches. The invention of the candle clock was attributed by the Anglo-Saxons to Alfred the Great, king of Wessex. The story of how the clock was created was narrated by Asser, who lived at Alfred's court and became his close associate. Alfred used six candles, each made from 12 pennyweights of wax, and made to be 12 inches (30 cm) high and of a uniform thickness. The candles were marked at intervals of an inch. Once lit, they were protected from the wind by being placed in a lantern made of wood and transparent horn. It would have taken 20 minutes to burn down to the next mark; the candles, burning one after the other, lasted for 24 hours.

=== Al-Jazari ===
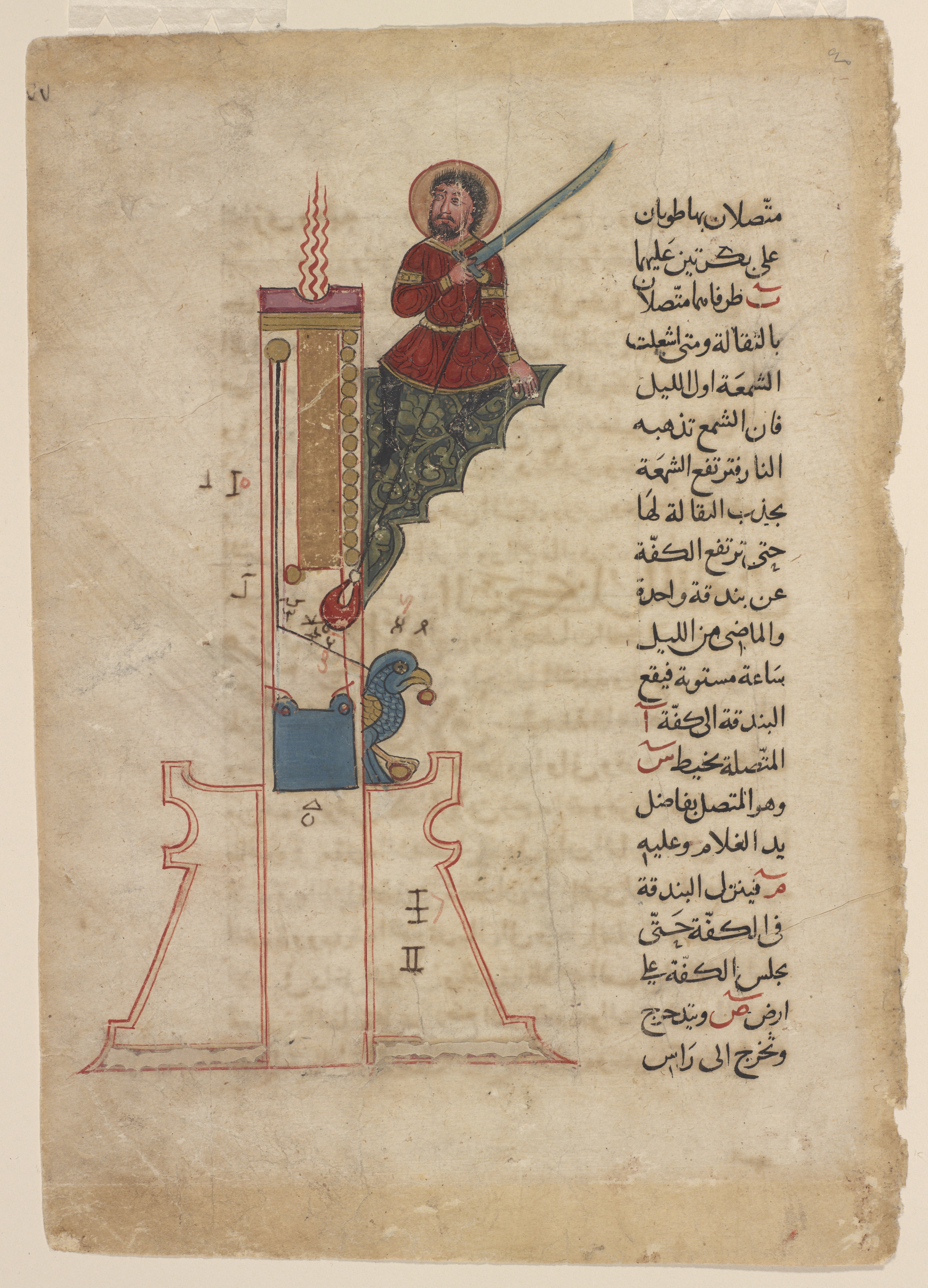
Al-Jazari's candle clock

Al-Jazari described a candle clock in 1206. It included a dial to display the time and, for the first time, employed a bayonet fitting, a fastening mechanism still used in modern times. The English engineer and historian Donald Routledge Hill described one of al-Jazari's candle clocks as follows:

The candle, whose rate of burning was known, bore against the underside of the cap, and its wick passed through the hole. Wax collected in the indentation and could be removed periodically so that it did not interfere with steady burning. The bottom of the candle rested in a shallow-dish that had a ring on its side connected through pulleys to a counterweight. As the candle burned away, the weight pushed it upward at a constant speed. The automata were operated from the dish at the bottom of the candle.

== Sources ==
- Asser (1983) [before 909]. Alfred the Great: Asser's Life of King Alfred and other contemporary sources. Translated by Keynes, Simon; Lapidge, Michael. London; New York: Penguin Books. ISBN 978-01404-4-409-4.
- Turner, Anthony J. The Time Museum, Volume I, Time Measuring Instruments; Part 3, Water-clocks, Sand-glasses, Fire-clocks
