= Ahmad Y. al-Hassan =

Historian of Arabic and Islamic science

Ahmad Yousef Al-Hassan (Arabic: أحمد يوسف الحسن) (June 25, 1925 – April 28, 2012) was a Palestinian/Syrian/Canadian historian of Arabic and Islamic science and technology, educated in Jerusalem, Cairo, and London with a PhD in mechanical engineering from University College London. He was Dean of Engineering and later President of the University of Aleppo where he founded the Institute for the History of Arabic Science (IHAS) and was its first director. He also served as Minister of Petroleum, Electricity and Mineral Resources of Syria prior to 1971. He migrated to Canada in 1982.

== Positions and awards ==
- Visiting Professor at the Department for the History and Philosophy of Science, University College, London
- Visiting Professor at the Department of Middle East and Islamic Studies, University of Toronto
- Professor at the Institute for the History of Arabic Science (IHAS), University of Aleppo
- Recipient of the Ordre National de la Légion d'honneur of the French Republic
