= Donald Hill =

British historian and engineer (1922–1994)

Donald Routledge Hill (6 August 1922 – 30 May 1994) was a British engineer and historian of science and technology best known for his translation of The Book of Knowledge of Ingenious Mechanical Devices of the Muslim engineer Ismail al-Jazari.

== Life and work ==
Born in London, after secondary school Hill served in the British army, in the Royal Engineers from 1941 to 1946. Two years he served in the Eighth Army in North Africa until he was wounded in action in Italy. Back in England he studied Engineering at the London University, obtaining his engineering degree in 1949. In 1964 he obtained his M.Litt in Islamic History at the University of Durham, and in 1970 his PhD from the University of London.

Late 1940s Hill started his career working for the Iraq Petroleum Company in Lebanon, Syria and Qatar. Back in England he worked for several petrochemical companies until his retirement in 1984.

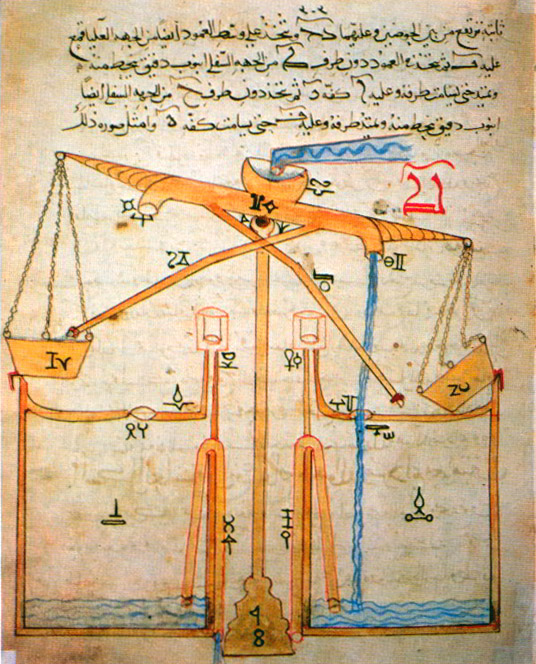
Diagram of a hydro-powered perpetual flute from The Book of Knowledge of Ingenious Mechanical Devices by Ismail al-Jazari, 1206.

Alongside more general works on the history of technology, Hill wrote works on the history of science and technology in the medieval Islamic world and translated The Book of Knowledge of Ingenious Mechanical Devices of Ismail al-Jazari.

== Selected publications ==
Books

- Hill, Donald Routledge (1984). A History of Engineering in Classical and Medieval Times, London: Croom Helm & La Salle, Illinois: Open Court, 1984. ISBN 0-87548-422-0.
- al-Hassan, Ahmad Y., & Hill, Donald R. (1986). Islamic technology: An illustrated history, Cambridge: Cambridge University Press/UNESCO. ISBN 0-521-26333-6.
- Hill, Donald (1993). Islamic Science and Engineering. Edinburgh: Edinburgh University Press. ISBN 9780748604579.
- Hill, Donald Routledge (1976). On The Construction of Water-Clocks — Kitab Arshimidas Fi'amal Al-Binkamat, London: Turner & Devereux Occasional Paper No. 4.
- Ibn Ismail Ibn al-Razzaz Al-Jazari & Hill, Donald Routledge (ed. & transl.) (1988), The Book of Knowledge of Ingenious Mechanical Devices: Kitáb fí ma'rifat al-hiyal al-handasiyya, Islamabad: Pakistan Hijara Council. ISBN 969-8016-25-2.
- Banū Mūsā & Hill, Donald Routledge (ed. & transl.) (1989), The Book of Ingenious Devices , Islamabad: Pakistan Hijara Council.

Articles, a selection

- Hill, Donald R (1993). Science and Technology in Ninth Century Baghdad, in Science in Western and Eastern Civilization in Carolongian Times, ed. P. L. Bouzer and D. Lohrmann; Birkhäuser; Boston. ISBN 0-8176-2863-0
