= Thabit =

Thabit (Arabic: ثابت) is an Arabic name for males that means "the imperturbable one". It is sometimes spelled Thabet.

== People with the patronymic ==
- Ibn Thabit, Libyan hip-hop musician
- Asim ibn Thabit (died 625), companion of Muhammad
- Hassan ibn Sabit (died 674), poet and companion of Muhammad
- Khuzaima ibn Thabit (died 657), companion of Muhammad
- Sinan ibn Thabit (880–943), physician and mathematician
- Zayd ibn Thabit (610–660), personal scribe of Muhammad
- Abdullah Thabit (born 1973), Saudi Arabian poet, novelist and journalist

== People with the given name ==
- Thabit ibn Qays, companion of Muhammad
- Thabit ibn Qurra (826–901), Baghdadi mathematician and astronomer

== See also ==
- Thabit number
- Tabit (town) (or Thabit), Sudan
- Upsilon Orionis or Thabit – a star in the constellation Orion
- Sabit, the Turkish equivalent of Thabit
