= Astronomy in the medieval Islamic world =

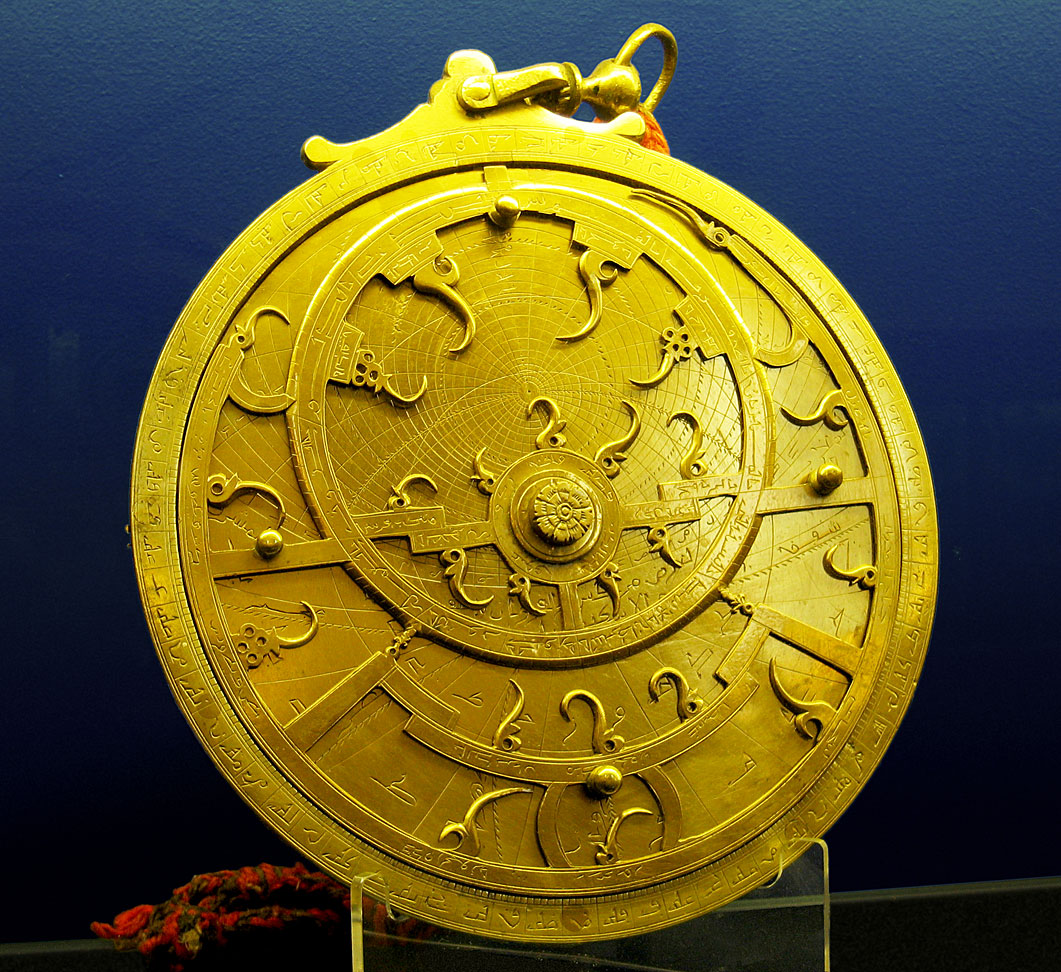
18th century Persian brass astrolabe at the Whipple Museum of the History of Science in Cambridge, England. The astrolabe consists of a disk engraved with the positions of the celestial bodies.

Medieval Islamic astronomy comprises the astronomical developments made in the Islamic world, particularly during the Islamic Golden Age (9th–13th centuries), and mostly written in the Arabic language. These developments mostly took place in the Middle East, Central Asia, Al-Andalus, and North Africa, and later in the Far East and India. It closely parallels the genesis of other Islamic sciences in its assimilation of foreign material and the amalgamation of the disparate elements of that material to create a science with Islamic characteristics. These included Greek, Sassanid, and Indian works in particular, which were translated and built upon.

Islamic astronomy played a significant role in the revival of ancient astronomy following the loss of knowledge during the early medieval period, notably with the production of Latin translations of Arabic works during the 12th century.

A significant number of stars in the sky, such as Aldebaran, Altair and Deneb, and astronomical terms such as alidade, azimuth, and nadir, are still referred to by their Arabic names. A large corpus of literature from Islamic astronomy remains today, numbering approximately 10,000 manuscripts scattered throughout the world, many of which have not been read or catalogued. Even so, a reasonably accurate picture of Islamic activity in the field of astronomy can be reconstructed.

== History ==
=== Pre-Islamic Arabs ===
The Islamic historian Ahmad Dallal notes that, unlike the Babylonians, Greeks, and Indians, who had developed elaborate systems of mathematical astronomical study, the pre-Islamic Arabs relied upon empirical observations. These were based on the rising and setting of particular stars, and this indigenous constellation tradition was known as Anwā’. The study of Anwā’ was developed after Islamization when Arab astronomers introduced mathematics to their study of the night sky.

=== Early period ===
The first astronomical texts that were translated into Arabic were of Indian and Persian origin. The most notable was Zij al-Sindhind, a zij produced by Muḥammad ibn Ibrāhīm al-Fazārī and Yaʿqūb ibn Ṭāriq, who translated an 8th-century Indian astronomical work after 770, with the assistance of Indian astronomers who were at the court of caliph Al-Mansur. Zij al-Shah was also based upon Indian astronomical tables, compiled in the Sasanian Empire over a period of two centuries. Fragments of texts during this period show that Arab astronomers adopted the sine function from India in place of the chords of arc used in Greek trigonometry.

Ptolemy's Almagest (a geocentric spherical Earth cosmic model) was translated at least five times in the late eighth and ninth centuries, which was the main authoritative work that informed the Arabic astronomical tradition.

The rise of Islam, with its obligation to determine the five daily prayer times and the qibla (the direction towards the Kaaba in the Sacred Mosque in Mecca) inspired intellectual progress in astronomy.

=== Astronomical methods ===
The philosopher Al-Farabi (d. 950) described astronomy in terms of mathematics, music, and optics. He showed how astronomy could be used to describe the Earth's motion, and the position and movement of celestial bodies, and separated mathematical astronomy from science, restricting astronomy to describing the position, shape, and size of distant objects. Al-Farabi used the writings of Ptolemy, as described in his Analemma, a way of calculating the Sun's position from any fixed location.

=== Golden Age ===
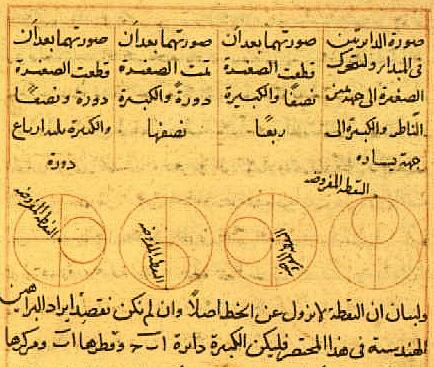
The Tusi-couple is a mathematical device invented by Nasir al-Din al-Tusi in which a small circle rotates inside a larger circle twice the diameter of the smaller circle. Rotations of the circles cause a point on the circumference of the smaller circle to oscillate back and forth in linear motion along a diameter of the larger circle.

The House of Wisdom was an academy that was open to the public and financially supported during the reign of the Abbasid caliph al-Ma'mun in the early 9th century in Baghdad. Astronomical research was greatly supported by al-Mamun through the House of Wisdom, al-Ma'mun also built the first observatory in Baghdad and subsequent observatories were built around regions of Iraq and Iran.

The first major Muslim work of astronomy was Zij al-Sindhind, produced by the mathematician Muhammad ibn Musa al-Khwarizmi in 830. It contained tables for the movements of the Sun, the Moon, and the planets Mercury, Venus, Mars, Jupiter and Saturn. The work introduced Ptolemaic concepts into Islamic science, and marked a turning point in Islamic astronomy, which had previously concentrated on translating works, but which now began to develop new ideas. Another notable figure in al-Ma'mun's court was Sind ibn 'Alī, a Jewish convert to Islam, who contributed to the Zīj al-Sindhind and was credited with constructing astronomical instruments.

Jewish scholars in the Islamic world also engaged with astronomical methods developed by their Muslim counterparts. In 931, Saadia Gaon (a leading rabbi and head of the Sura Academy in Iraq) used a zīj to calculate the positions of the sun, moon, and five visible planets at a specific time, as noted in his commentary on Sefer Yetzirah. He may have studied the zīj tradition in part to counter contemporaries who sought to use such calculations to determine and sanctify the new moon each month.

=== Doubts on Ptolemy ===
In 850, the Abbasid astronomer Al-Farghani wrote Kitab fi Jawami ("A compendium of the science of stars"). The book gave a summary of Ptolemic cosmography. However, it also corrected Ptolemy based on the findings of earlier Arab astronomers. Al-Farghani gave revised values for the obliquity of the ecliptic, the precession of the apogees of the Sun and the Moon, and the circumference of the Earth. The book was circulated through the Muslim world, and translated into Latin.

By the 10th century, texts had appeared that doubted that Ptolemy's works were correct. Islamic scholars questioned the Earth's apparent immobility, and position at the centre of the universe, now that independent investigations into the Ptolemaic system were possible.

The 10th century Egyptian astronomer Ibn Yunus found errors in Ptolemy's calculations. Ptolemy calculated that the Earth's angle of axial precession varied by one degree every 100 years. Ibn Yunus calculated the rate of change to be one degree every 70 1/4 years.

Between 1025 and 1028, the polymath Ibn al-Haytham wrote his Al-Shukuk ala Batlamyus ("Doubts on Ptolemy"). While not disputing the existence of the geocentric model, he criticized elements of the Ptolemy's theories. Other astronomers took up the challenge posed in this work, and went on to develop alternate models that resolved the difficulties identified by Ibn al-Haytham. In 1070, Abu Ubayd al-Juzjani published the Tarik al-Aflak, in which he discussed the issues arising from Ptolemy's theory of equants, and proposed a solution. The anonymous work al-Istidrak ala Batlamyus ("Recapitulation regarding Ptolemy"), produced in Al-Andalus, included a list of objections to Ptolemic astronomy.

Nasir al-Din al-Tusi also exposed problems present in Ptolemy's work. In 1261, he published his Tadkhira, which contained 16 fundamental problems he found with Ptolemaic astronomy, and by doing this, set off a chain of Islamic scholars that would attempt to solve these problems. Scholars such as Qutb al-Din al-Shirazi, Ibn al-Shatir, and Shams al-Din al-Khafri all worked to produce new models for solving Tusi's 16 Problems, and the models they worked to create would become widely adopted by astronomers for use in their own works.

This model presenting how Nasir al-Din al-Tusi explain the motion of Earth, relative to the Moon and the Sun using the Tusi couple. It is used to support that Earth rotates around something, and equant is not the correct way to explain the motion of the Moon around Earth.

Nasir al-Din Tusi wanted to use the concept of Tusi couple to replace the "equant" concept in Ptolemic model. Since the equant concept would result in the Moon distance to change dramatically through each month, at least by the factor of two if the math is done. But with the Tusi couple, the Moon would just rotate around Earth resulting in the correct observation and applied concept. Mu'ayyad al-Din al-Urdi was another engineer/scholar that tried to make sense of the motion of planets. He came up with the concept of lemma, which is a way of representing the epicyclical motion of planets without using Ptolemic method. Lemma was intended to replace the concept of equant as well.

==== Earth rotation ====
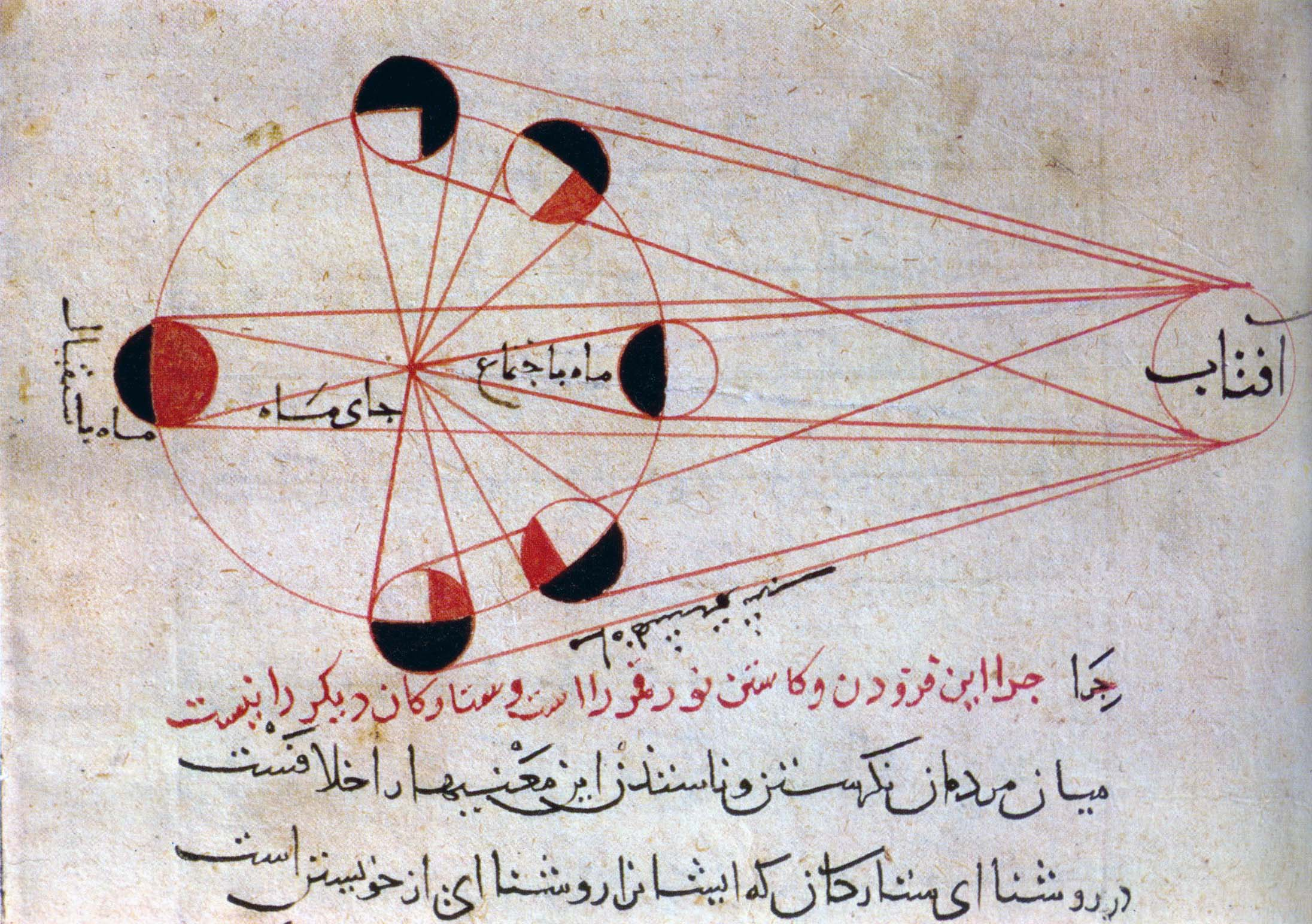
An illustration from al-Biruni's astronomical works that explains the different phases of the moon, with respect to the position of the Sun.

Abu Rayhan Biruni (b. 973) discussed the possibility of whether the Earth rotated about its own axis and around the Sun, but in his Masudic Canon, he set forth the principles that the Earth is at the center of the universe and that it has no motion of its own. He was aware that if the Earth rotated on its axis, this would be consistent with his astronomical parameters, but he considered this a problem of natural philosophy rather than mathematics.

His contemporary, Abu Sa'id al-Sijzi, accepted that the Earth rotates around its axis. Al-Biruni described an astrolabe invented by Sijzi based on the idea that the earth rotates.

The fact that some people did believe that the Earth is moving on its own axis is further confirmed by an Arabic reference work from the 13th century which states:

According to the geometers [or engineers] (muhandisīn), the earth is in a constant circular motion, and what appears to be the motion of the heavens is actually due to the motion of the earth and not the stars.

At the Maragha and Samarkand observatories, the Earth's rotation was discussed by Najm al-Din al-Qazwini al-Katibi (d. 1277), Tusi (b. 1201) and Qushji (b. 1403). The arguments and evidence used by Tusi and Qushji resemble those used by Copernicus to support the Earth's motion. However, it remains a fact that the Maragha school never made the big leap to heliocentrism.

==== Alternative geocentric systems ====
In the 12th century, non-heliocentric alternatives to the Ptolemaic system were developed by some Islamic astronomers in al-Andalus, following a tradition established by Ibn Bajjah, Ibn Tufail, and Ibn Rushd.

A notable example is Nur ad-Din al-Bitruji, who considered the Ptolemaic model mathematical, and not physical. Al-Bitruji proposed a theory on planetary motion in which he wished to avoid both epicycles and eccentrics. He was unsuccessful in replacing Ptolemy's planetary model, as the numerical predictions of the planetary positions in his configuration were less accurate than those of the Ptolemaic model. One original aspects of al-Bitruji's system is his proposal of a physical cause of celestial motions. He contradicts the Aristotelian idea that there is a specific kind of dynamics for each world, applying instead the same dynamics to the sublunar and the celestial worlds.

=== Later period ===
In the late 13th century, Nasir al-Din al-Tusi created the Tusi couple, as pictured above. Other notable astronomers from the later medieval period include Mu'ayyad al-Din al-Urdi (c. 1266), Qutb al-Din al-Shirazi (c. 1311), Sadr al-Sharia al-Bukhari (c. 1347), Ibn al-Shatir (c. 1375), and Ali Qushji (c. 1474).

In the 15th century, the Timurid ruler Ulugh Beg of Samarkand established his court as a center of patronage for astronomy. He studied it in his youth, and in 1420 ordered the construction of Ulugh Beg Observatory, which produced a new set of astronomical tables, as well as contributing to other scientific and mathematical advances.

Several major astronomical works were produced in the early 16th century, including ones by Al-Birjandi (d. 1525 or 1526) and Shams al-Din al-Khafri (fl. 1525). However, the vast majority of works written in this and later periods in the history of Islamic sciences are yet to be studied.

== Influences ==
=== Africa ===
Islamic astronomy influenced Malian astronomy.

=== Europe ===
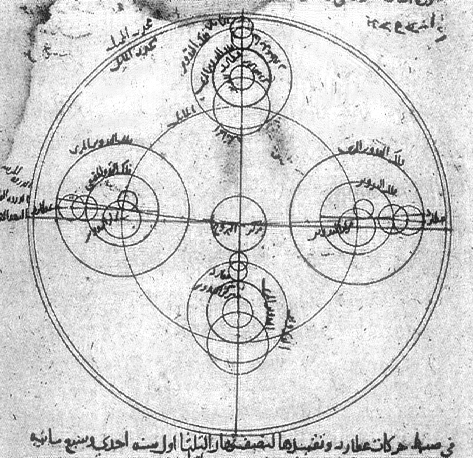
Ibn al-Shatir's model for the appearances of Mercury, showing the multiplication of epicycles using the Tusi-couple, thus eliminating the Ptolemaic eccentrics and equant.

Several works of Islamic astronomy were translated to Latin starting from the 12th century.

The work of al-Battani (d. 929), Kitāb az-Zīj ("Book of Astronomical Tables"), was frequently cited by European astronomers and received several reprints, including one with annotations by Regiomontanus. Nicolaus Copernicus, in his book that initiated the Copernican Revolution, the De revolutionibus orbium coelestium, mentioned al-Battani no fewer than 23 times, and also mentions him in the Commentariolus. Tycho Brahe, Giovanni Battista Riccioli, Johannes Kepler, Galileo Galilei, and others frequently cited him or his observations. His data is still used in geophysics.

Around 1190, al-Bitruji published an alternative geocentric system to Ptolemy's model. His system spread through most of Europe during the 13th century, with debates and refutations of his ideas continued to the 16th century. In 1217, Michael Scot finished a Latin translation of al-Bitruji's Book of Cosmology (Kitāb al-Hayʾah), which became a valid alternative to Ptolemy's Almagest in scholasticist circles. Several European writers, including Albertus Magnus and Roger Bacon, explained it in detail and compared it with Ptolemy's. Copernicus cited his system in the De revolutionibus while discussing theories of the order of the inferior planets.

Some historians maintain that the thought of the Maragheh observatory, in particular the mathematical devices known as the Urdi lemma and the Tusi couple, influenced Renaissance-era European astronomy and thus Copernicus. Copernicus used such devices in the same planetary models as found in Arabic sources. Furthermore, the exact replacement of the equant by two epicycles used by Copernicus in the Commentariolus was found in an earlier work by Ibn al-Shatir (d. c. 1375) of Damascus. Copernicus' lunar and Mercury models are also identical to Ibn al-Shatir's.

While the influence of the criticism of Ptolemy by Averroes on Renaissance thought is clear and explicit, the claim of direct influence of the Maragha school, postulated by Otto E. Neugebauer in 1957, remains an open question. Since the Tusi couple was used by Copernicus in his reformulation of mathematical astronomy, there is a growing consensus that he became aware of this idea in some way. It has been suggested that the idea of the Tusi couple may have arrived in Europe leaving few manuscript traces, since it could have occurred without the translation of any Arabic text into Latin. One possible route of transmission may have been through Byzantine science, which translated some of al-Tusi's works from Arabic into Byzantine Greek. Several Byzantine Greek manuscripts containing the Tusi-couple are still extant in Italy. Other scholars have argued that Copernicus could well have developed these ideas independently of the late Islamic tradition. Copernicus explicitly references several astronomers of the "Islamic Golden Age" (10th to 12th centuries) in De Revolutionibus: Albategnius (Al-Battani), Averroes (Ibn Rushd), Thebit (Thābit ibn Qurra), Arzachel (Al-Zarqali), and Alpetragius (Al-Bitruji), but he does not show awareness of the existence of any of the later astronomers of the Maragha school.

It has been argued that Copernicus could have independently discovered the Tusi couple or took the idea from Proclus's Commentary on the First Book of Euclid, which Copernicus cited.

Another possible source for Copernicus's knowledge of this mathematical device is the Questiones de Spera of Nicole Oresme, who described how a reciprocating linear motion of a celestial body could be produced by a combination of circular motions similar to those proposed by al-Tusi.

=== China ===
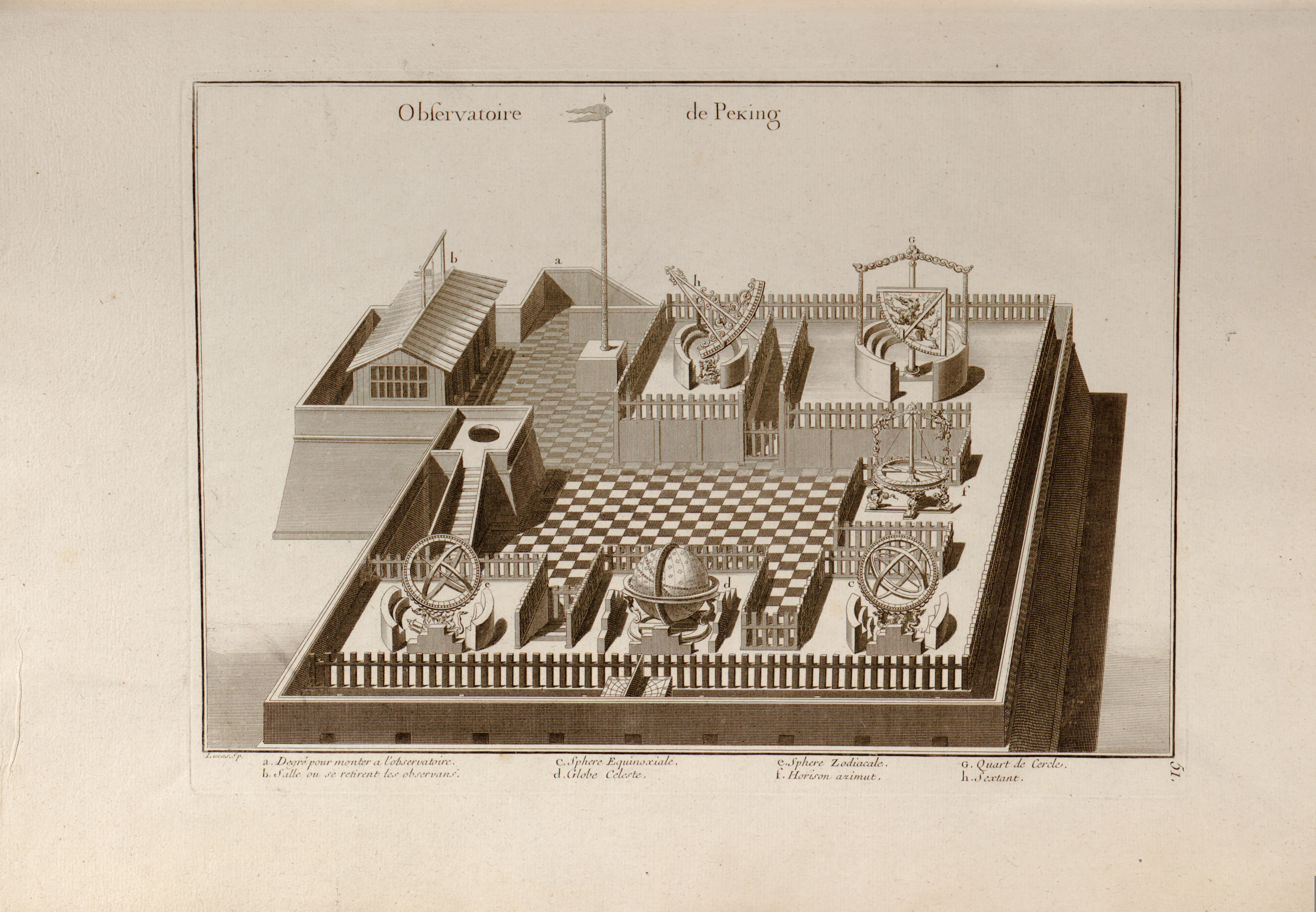
Layout of the Beijing Ancient Observatory.

Islamic influence on Chinese astronomy was first recorded during the Song dynasty when a Hui Muslim astronomer named Ma Yize introduced the concept of seven days in a week and made other contributions.

Islamic astronomers were brought to China in order to work on calendar making and astronomy during the Mongol Empire and the succeeding Yuan dynasty. The Chinese scholar Yeh-lu Chu'tsai accompanied Genghis Khan to Persia in 1210 and studied their calendar for use in the Mongol Empire. Kublai Khan brought Iranians to Beijing to construct an observatory and an institution for astronomical studies.

Several Chinese astronomers worked at the Maragheh observatory, founded by Nasir al-Din al-Tusi in 1259 under the patronage of Hulagu Khan in Persia. One of these Chinese astronomers was Fu Mengchi, or Fu Mezhai. In 1267, the Persian astronomer Jamal ad-Din, who previously worked at Maragha observatory, presented Kublai Khan with seven Persian astronomical instruments, including a terrestrial globe and an armillary sphere, as well as an astronomical almanac, which was later known in China as the Wannian Li ("Ten Thousand Year Calendar" or "Eternal Calendar"). He was known as "Zhamaluding" in China, where, in 1271, he was appointed by Khan as the first director of the Islamic observatory in Beijing, known as the Islamic Astronomical Bureau, which operated alongside the Chinese Astronomical Bureau for four centuries. Islamic astronomy gained a good reputation in China for its theory of planetary latitudes, which did not exist in Chinese astronomy at the time, and for its accurate prediction of eclipses.

Some of the astronomical instruments constructed by the famous Chinese astronomer Guo Shoujing shortly afterwards resemble the style of instrumentation built at Maragheh. In particular, the "simplified instrument" (jianyi) and the large gnomon at the Gaocheng Astronomical Observatory show traces of Islamic influence. While formulating the Shoushili calendar in 1281, Shoujing's work in spherical trigonometry may have also been partially influenced by Islamic mathematics, which was largely accepted at Kublai's court. These possible influences include a pseudo-geometrical method for converting between equatorial and ecliptic coordinates, the systematic use of decimals in the underlying parameters, and the application of cubic interpolation in the calculation of the irregularity in the planetary motions.

Hongwu Emperor (r. 1368–1398) of the Ming dynasty (1328–1398), in the first year of his reign (1368), conscripted Han and non-Han astrology specialists from the astronomical institutions in Beijing of the former Mongolian Yuan to Nanjing to become officials of the newly established national observatory.

That year, the Ming government summoned for the first time the astronomical officials to come south from the upper capital of Yuan. There were fourteen of them. In order to enhance accuracy in methods of observation and computation, Hongwu Emperor reinforced the adoption of parallel calendar systems, the Han and the Hui. In the following years, the Ming Court appointed several Hui astrologers to hold high positions in the Imperial Observatory. They wrote many books on Islamic astronomy and also manufactured astronomical equipment based on the Islamic system.

The translation of two important works into Chinese was completed in 1383: Zij (1366) and al-Madkhal fi Sina'at Ahkam al-Nujum, Introduction to Astrology (1004).

In 1384, a Chinese astrolabe was made for observing stars based on the instructions for making multi-purposed Islamic equipment. In 1385, the apparatus was installed on a hill in northern Nanjing.

Around 1384, during the Ming dynasty, Hongwu Emperor ordered the Chinese translation and compilation of Islamic astronomical tables, a task that was carried out by the scholars Mashayihei, a Muslim astronomer, and Wu Bozong, a Chinese scholar-official. These tables came to be known as the Huihui Lifa (Muslim System of Calendrical Astronomy), which was published in China a number of times until the early 18th century, though the Qing dynasty had officially abandoned the tradition of Chinese-Islamic astronomy in 1659. The Muslim astronomer Yang Guangxian was known for his attacks on the Jesuit's astronomical sciences.

=== Korea ===
In the early Joseon, the Islamic calendar served as a basis for calendar reform being more accurate than the existing Chinese-based calendars. A Korean translation of the Huihui Lifa, a text combining Chinese astronomy with Islamic astronomy works of Jamal ad-Din, was studied in Joseon Korea during the time of Sejong the Great in the 15th century.

== Observatories ==
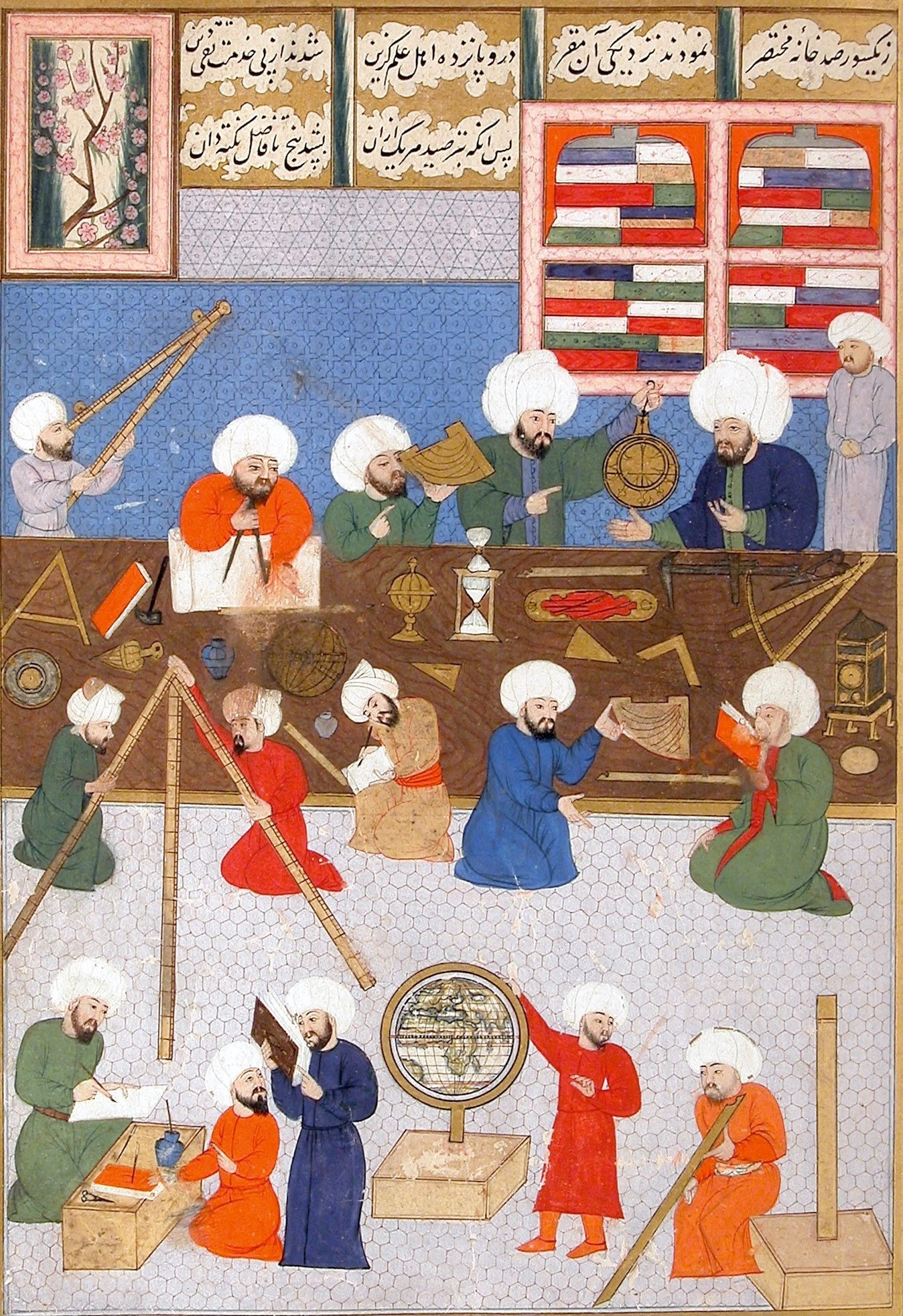
Work in the observatorium of Taqi al-Din.

The first systematic observations in Islam are reported to have taken place under the patronage of al-Mamun. Here, and in many other private observatories from Damascus to Baghdad, meridian degree measurement were performed (al-Ma'mun's arc measurement), solar parameters were established, and detailed observations of the Sun, Moon, and planets were undertaken.

During the 10th century, the Buwayhid dynasty encouraged the undertaking of extensive works in astronomy; such as the construction of a large-scale instruments with which observations were made in the year 950. This is known through recordings made in the zij of astronomers such as Ibn al-A'lam. The great astronomer Abd al-Rahman al-Sufi was patronised by prince 'Adud al-Dawla, who systematically revised Ptolemy's catalogue of stars. Sharaf al-Dawla also established a similar observatory in Baghdad. Reports by Ibn Yunus and al-Zarqali in Toledo and Cordoba indicate the use of sophisticated instruments for their time.

It was Malik Shah I who established the first large observatory, probably in Isfahan. It was here where Omar Khayyám with many other collaborators constructed a zij and formulated the Persian Solar Calendar a.k.a. the jalali calendar. A modern version of this calendar, the Solar Hijri calendar, is still in official use in Iran and Afghanistan today.

The most influential observatory was however founded by Hulegu Khan during the 13th century. Here, Nasir al-Din al-Tusi supervised its technical construction at Maragha. The facility contained resting quarters for Hulagu Khan, as well as a library and mosque. Some of the top astronomers of the day gathered there, and from their collaboration resulted important modifications to the Ptolemaic system over a period of 50 years.

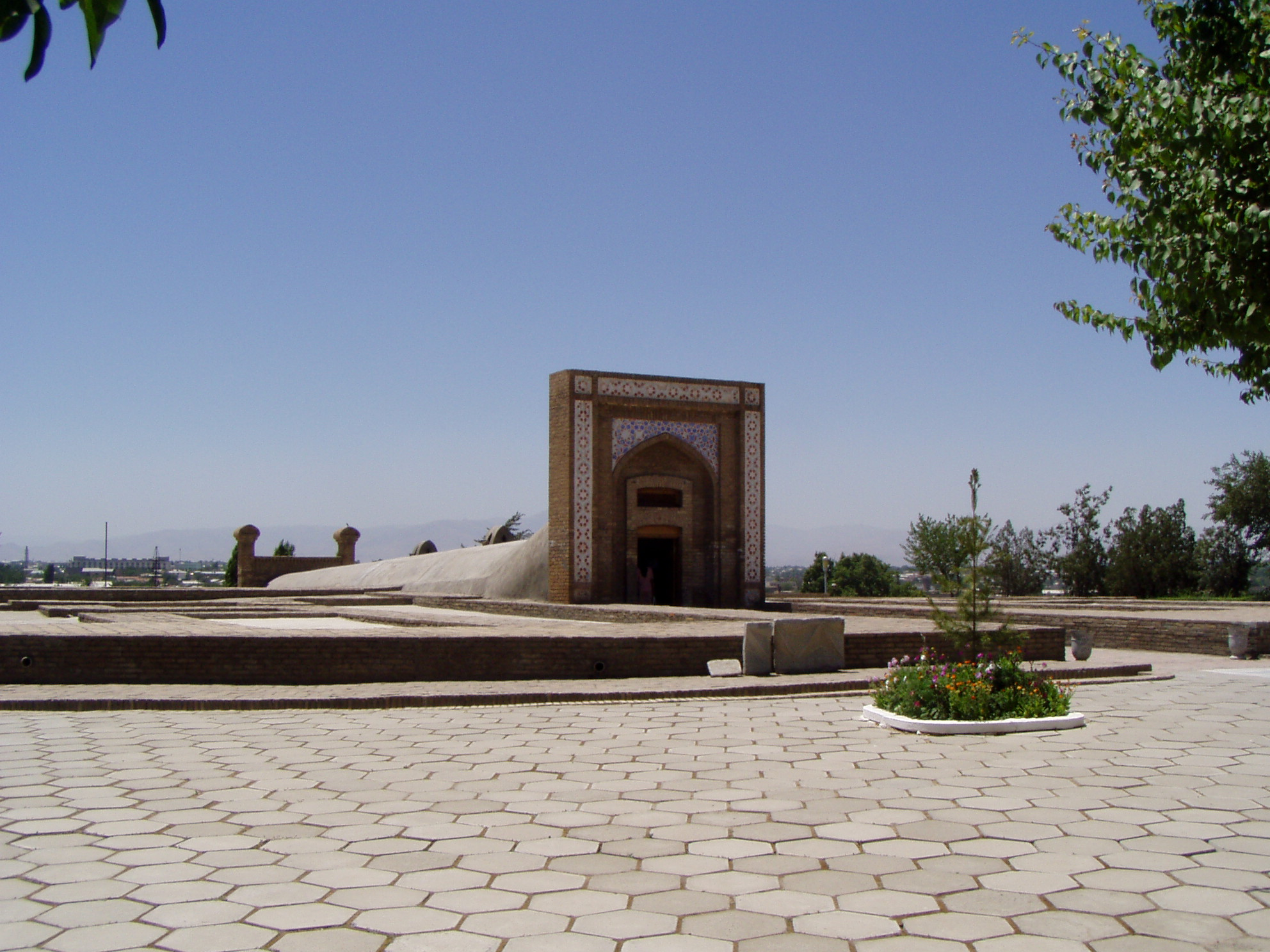
The Ulugh Beg Observatory in Samarkand.

In 1420, prince Ulugh Beg, himself an astronomer and mathematician, founded another large observatory in Samarkand, the remains of which were excavated in 1908 by Russian teams.

And finally, Taqi ad-Din Muhammad ibn Ma'ruf founded a large observatory in Ottoman Constantinople in 1577, which was on the same scale as those in Maragha and Samarkand. The observatory was short-lived however, as opponents of the observatory and prognostication from the heavens prevailed and the observatory was destroyed in 1580. While the Ottoman clergy did not object to the science of astronomy, the observatory was primarily being used for astrology, which they did oppose, and successfully sought its destruction.

As observatory development continued, Islamicate scientists began to pioneer the planetarium. The major difference between a planetarium and an observatory is how the universe is projected. In an observatory, viewers look up into the night sky, on the other hand, planetariums allow for universes planets and stars to project at eye-level in a room. Scientist Ibn Firnas, created a planetarium in his home that included artificial storm noises and was completely made of glass.

== Instruments ==
Our knowledge of the instruments used by Muslim astronomers primarily comes from two sources: first the remaining instruments in private and museum collections today, and second the treatises and manuscripts preserved from the Middle Ages. Muslim astronomers of the "Golden Period" made many improvements to instruments already in use before their time, such as adding new scales or details.

=== Celestial globes and armillary spheres ===
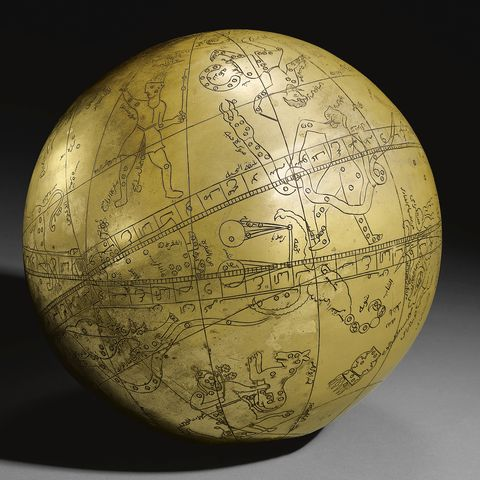
A Large Persian Brass Celestial Globe with an ascription to Hadi Isfahani and a date of 1197 AH/ 1782–3 AD of typical spherical form, the globe engraved with markings, figures and astrological symbols, inscriptive details throughout

Celestial globes were used primarily for solving problems in celestial astronomy. Today, 126 such instruments remain worldwide, the oldest from the 11th century. The altitude of the Sun, or the Right Ascension and Declination of stars could be calculated with these by inputting the location of the observer on the meridian ring of the globe. The initial blueprint for a portable celestial globe to measure celestial coordinates came from Spanish Muslim astronomer Jabir ibn Aflah (d. 1145). Another skillful Muslim astronomer working on celestial globes was Abd al-Rahman al-Sufi (b. 903), whose treatise the Book of Fixed Stars describes how to design the constellation images on the globe, as well as how to use the celestial globe. However, it was in Iraq in the 10th century that astronomer Al-Battani was working on celestial globes to record celestial data. This was different because up until then, the traditional use for a celestial globe was as an observational instrument. Al-Battani's treatise describes in detail the plotting coordinates for 1,022 stars, as well as how the stars should be marked. An armillary sphere had similar applications. No early Islamic armillary spheres survive, but several treatises on "the instrument with the rings" were written. In this context there is also an Islamic development, the spherical astrolabe, of which only one complete instrument, from the 14th century, has survived.

=== Astrolabes ===
Brass astrolabes were an invention of late antiquity. The first Islamic astronomer reported as having built an astrolabe is Muhammad al-Fazari (late 8th century). Astrolabes were popular in the Islamic world during the "Golden Age", chiefly as an aid to finding the qibla. The earliest known example is dated to 927/8 (AH 315).

The device was incredibly useful, and sometime during the 10th century it was brought to Europe from the Muslim world, where it inspired Latin scholars to take up an interest in both math and astronomy.

The largest function of the astrolabe is it serves as a portable model of space that can calculate the approximate location of any heavenly body found within the Solar System at any point in time, provided the latitude of the observer is accounted for. In order to adjust for latitude, astrolabes often had a second plate on top of the first, which the user could swap out to account for their correct latitude. One of the most useful features of the device is that the projection created allows users to calculate and solve mathematical problems graphically which could otherwise be done only by using complex spherical trigonometry, allowing for earlier access to great mathematical feats. In addition to this, use of the astrolabe allowed for ships at sea to calculate their position given that the device is fixed upon a star with a known altitude. Standard astrolabes performed poorly on the ocean, as bumpy waters and aggressive winds made use difficult, so a new iteration of the device, known as a Mariner's astrolabe, was developed to counteract the difficult conditions of the sea.

The instruments were used to read the time of the Sun rising and fixed stars. al-Zarqali of Andalusia constructed one such instrument in which, unlike its predecessors, did not depend on the latitude of the observer, and could be used anywhere. This instrument became known in Europe as the Saphea.

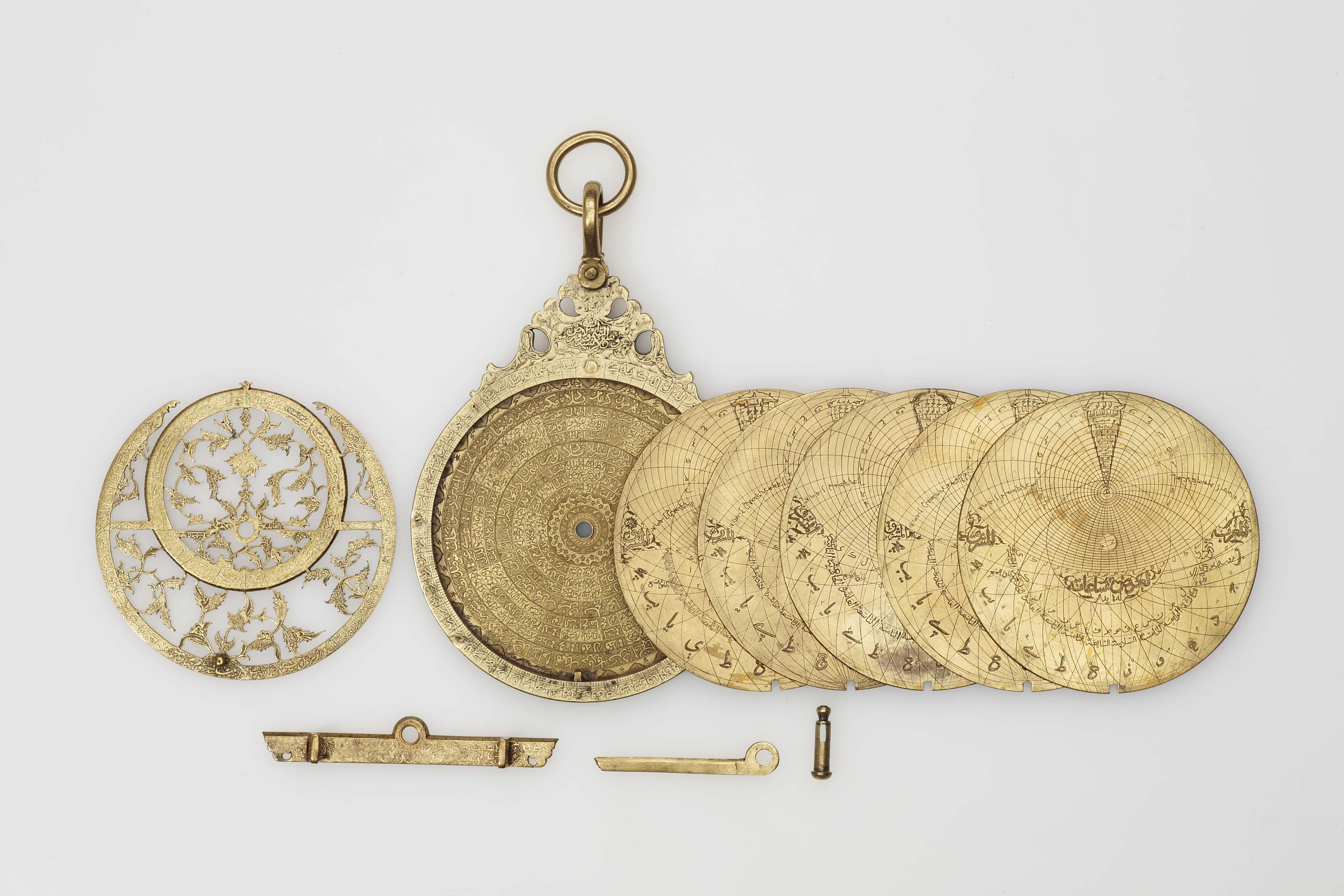
Mid-17th century astrolabe inscribed with Quranic verses and Persian poetry as well as technical information, with five interchangeable plates corresponding to the latitudes of major cities

The astrolabe was arguably the most important instrument created and used for astronomical purposes in the medieval period. Its invention in early medieval times required immense study and much trial and error in order to find the right method of which to construct it to where it would work efficiently and consistently, and its invention led to several mathematic advances which came from the problems that arose from using the instrument. The astrolabe's original purpose was to allow one to find the altitudes of the sun and many visible stars, during the day and night, respectively. However, they have ultimately come to provide great contribution to the progress of mapping the globe, thus resulting in further exploration of the sea, which then resulted in a series of positive events that allowed the world we know today to come to be. The astrolabe has served many purposes over time, and it has shown to be quite a key factor from medieval times to the present.

The astrolabe required the use of mathematics, and the development of the instrument incorporated azimuth circles, which opened a series of questions on further mathematical dilemmas. Astrolabes served the purpose of finding the altitude of the sun, which also meant that they provided one the ability to find the direction of Muslim prayer (or the direction of Mecca). Aside from these purposes, the astrolabe had a great influence on navigation, specifically in the marine world. This advancement made the calculation of latitude simpler, which led to an increase in sea exploration, and indirectly led to the Renaissance revolution, an increase in global trade activity, and ultimately the discovery of several of the world's continents.

=== Mechanical calendar ===
Abu Rayhan Biruni designed an instrument he called "Box of the Moon", which was a mechanical lunisolar calendar, employing a gear train and eight gear-wheels. This was an early example of a fixed-wired knowledge processing machine. This work of Al Biruni uses the same gear trains preserved in a 6th-century Byzantine portable sundial.

=== Sundials ===
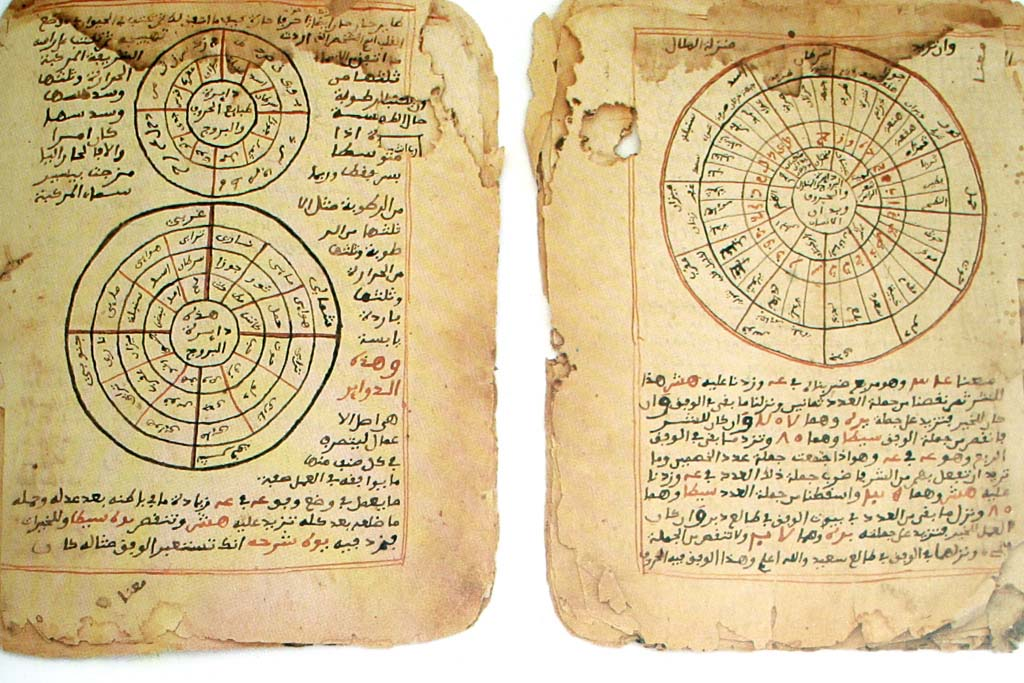
The Timbuktu Manuscripts showing both mathematics and astronomy.

Muslims made several important improvements to the theory and construction of sundials, which they inherited from their Indian and Greek predecessors. Khwarizmi made tables for these instruments which considerably shortened the time needed to make specific calculations.

Sundials were frequently placed on mosques to determine the time of prayer. One of the most striking examples was built in the 14th century by the muwaqqit (timekeeper) of the Umayyad Mosque in Damascus, ibn al-Shatir.

=== Quadrants ===
Several forms of quadrants were invented by Muslims. Among them was the sine quadrant used for astronomical calculations, and various forms of the horary quadrant used to determine the time (especially the times of prayer) by observations of the Sun or stars. A center of the development of quadrants was 9th century Baghdad. Abu Bakr ibn al-Sarah al-Hamawi (d. 1329) was a Syrian astronomer that invented a quadrant called “al-muqantarat al-yusra”. He devoted his time to writing several books on his accomplishments and advancements with quadrants and geometrical problems. His works on quadrants include Treatise on Operations with the Hidden Quadrant and Rare Pearls on Operations with the Circle for Finding Sines. These instruments could measure the altitude between a celestial object and the horizon. However, as Muslim astronomers used them, they began to find other ways to use them. For example, the mural quadrant, for recording the angles of planets and celestial bodies. Or the universal quadrant, for latitude solving astronomical problems. The horary quadrant, for finding the time of day with the sun. The almucantar quadrant, which was developed from the astrolabe.

=== Equatoria ===
Planetary equatoria were probably made by ancient Greeks, although no findings nor descriptions have been preserved from that period. In his comment on Ptolemy's Handy Tables, 4th century mathematician Theon of Alexandria introduced some diagrams to geometrically compute the position of the planets based on Ptolemy's epicyclical theory. The first description of the construction of a solar (as opposed to planetary) equatorium is contained in Proclus's 5th century work Hypotyposis, where he gives instructions on how to construct one in wood or bronze.

The earliest known description of a planetary equatorial is contained in early 11th century treatise by Ibn al-Samh, preserved only as a 13th-century Castilian translation contained in the Libros del saber de astronomia (Books of the knowledge of astronomy); the same book contains also a 1080/1081 treatise on the equatorial by Al-Zarqali.

== Astronomy in Islamic art ==
Examples of cosmological imagery in Islamic art can be found in objects such as manuscripts, astrological tools, and palace frescoes, and the study of the heavens by Islamic astronomers has translated into artistic representations of the universe and astrological concepts. The Islamic world gleaned inspiration from Greek, Iranian, and Indian traditions to represent the stars and the universe.

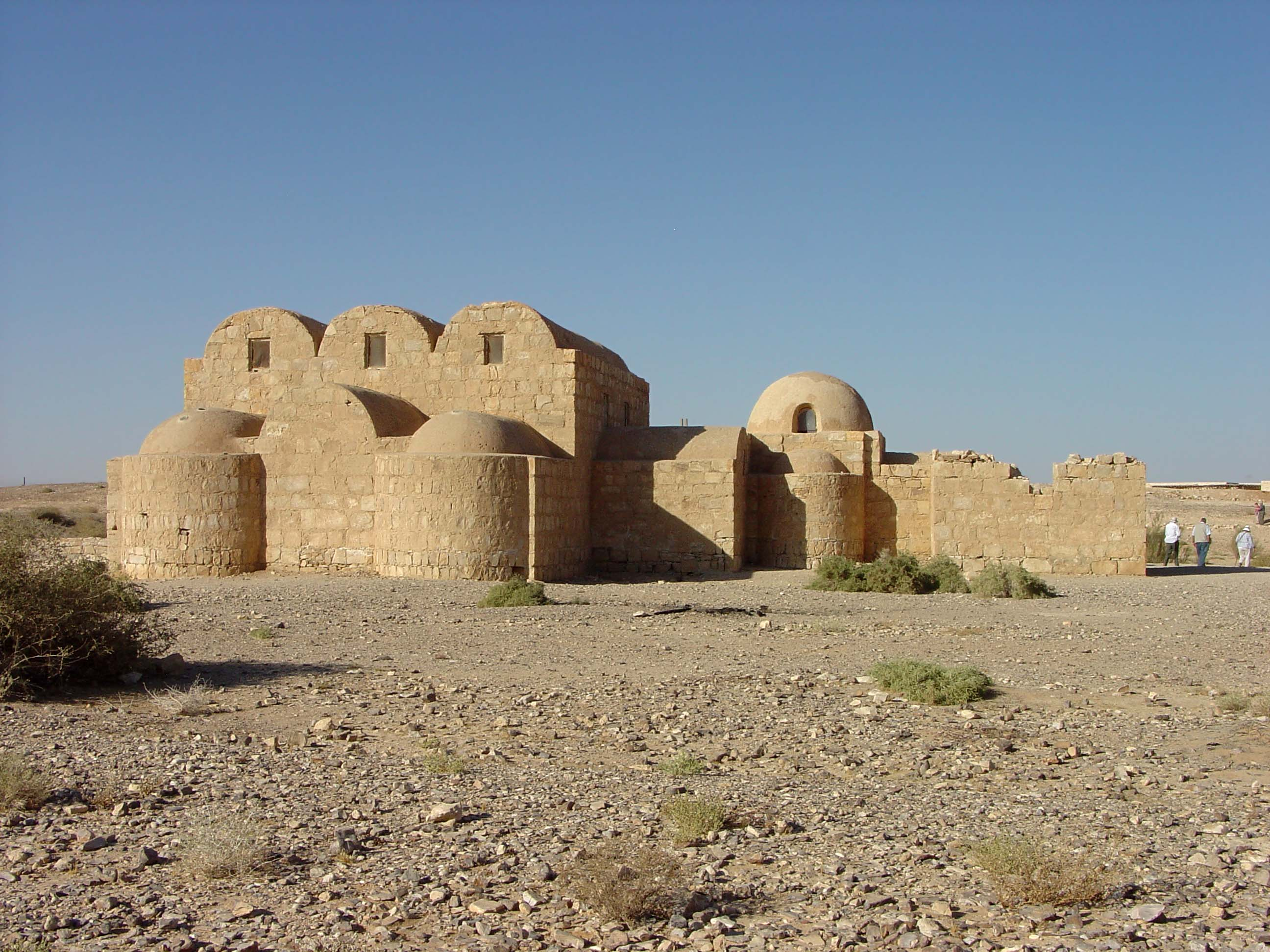
The bath complex at Qasr Amra, Jordan

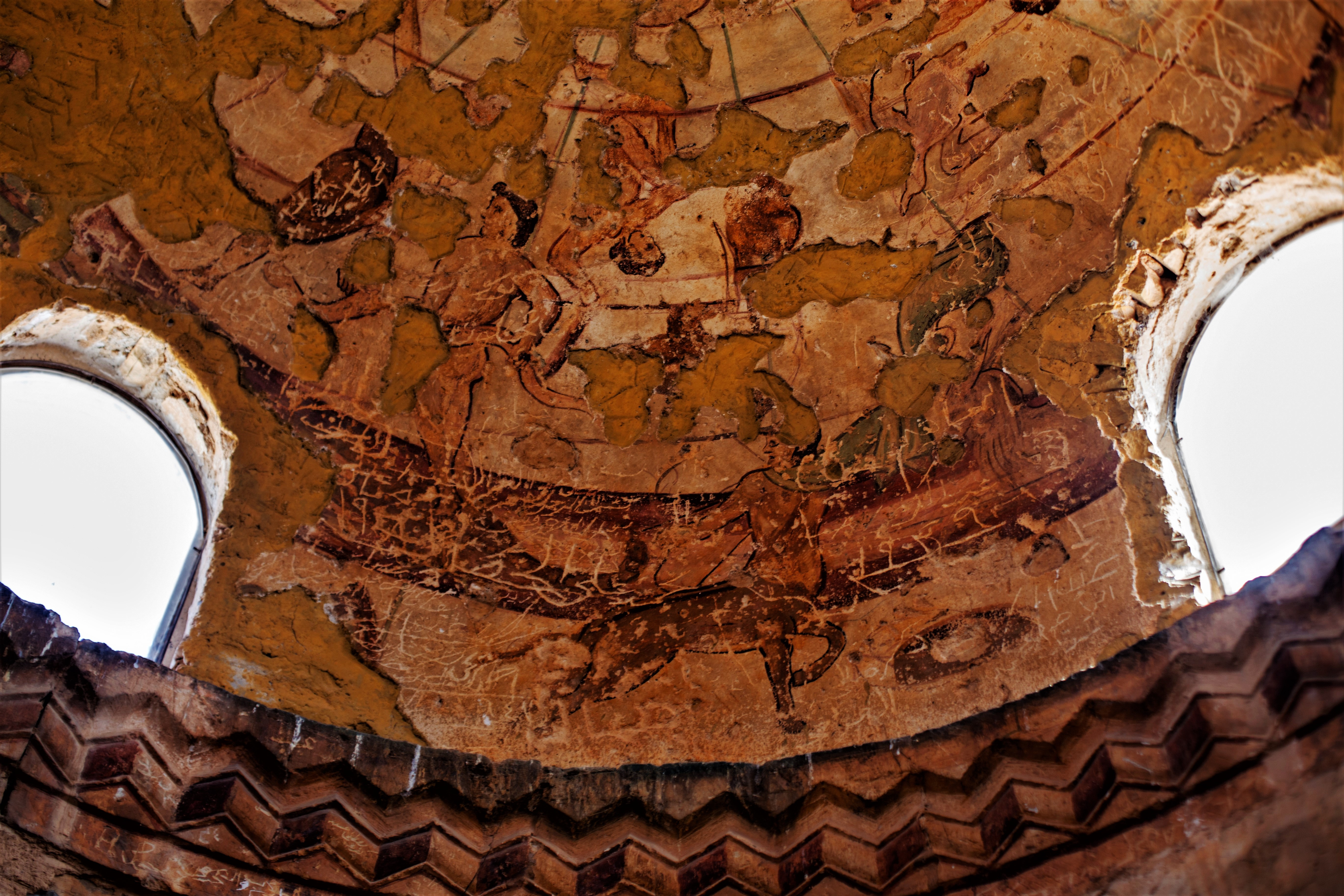
Detail of the Interior of the bath dome

The desert castle at Qasr Amra, which was used as a Umayyad palace, has a bath dome decorated with the Islamic zodiac and other celestial designs.

The Islamic zodiac and astrological visuals can be seen in examples of metalwork. Ewers depicting the twelve zodiac symbols exist in order to emphasize elite craftsmanship and carry blessings such as one example now at the Metropolitan Museum of Art. Coinage also carried zodiac imagery that bears the sole purpose of representing the month in which the coin was minted. As a result, astrological symbols could have been used as both decoration, and a means to communicate symbolic meanings or specific information.

== Notable astronomers ==
Some of the below are from Hill (1993), Islamic Science And Engineering'.

- Yaqūb ibn Tāriq
- Ibrahim al-Fazari
- Muhammad al-Fazari
- Mashallah ibn Athari
- Naubakht
- Abu Hanifa Dinawari
- Al-Khwarizmi, also a mathematician
- Abu Ma'shar al-Balkhi (Albumasar)
- Al-Farghani
- Banū Mūsā (Ben Mousa)
  - Ja'far Muhammad ibn Mūsā ibn Shākir
  - Ahmad ibn Mūsā ibn Shākir
  - Al-Hasan ibn Mūsā ibn Shākir
- Thābit ibn Qurra (Thebit)
  - Sinan ibn Thabit
  - Ibrahim ibn Sinan
- Sind ibn Ali
- Al-Majriti
- Al-Battani (Albatenius)
- Al-Farabi (Abunaser)
- Abd Al-Rahman Al Sufi
- Abu Sa'id Gorgani
- Kushyar ibn Labban
- Abū Ja'far al-Khāzin
- Al-Mahani
- Al-Marwazi
- Al-Nayrizi
- Al-Saghani
- Brethren of Purity
- Abū Sahl al-Qūhī (Kuhi)
- Abu-Mahmud al-Khujandi
- Abū al-Wafā' al-Būzjānī
- Ibn Yunus
- Abu Nasr Mansur
- Ibn al-Haytham (Alhacen)
- Al-Biruni
- Avicenna
- Abū Ishāq Ibrāhīm al-Zarqālī (Arzachel)
- Omar Khayyám
- Al-Khazini
- Ibn Bajjah (Avempace)
- Ibn Tufail (Abubacer)
- Nur Ed-Din Al Betrugi (Alpetragius)
- Averroes
- Al-Jazari
- Anvari
- Sharaf al-Dīn al-Tūsī
- Mo'ayyeduddin Urdi
- Nasir al-Din al-Tusi
- Ibn al-Nafis
- Qutb al-Din al-Shirazi
- Ibn al-Shatir
- Shams al-Dīn al-Samarqandī
- Jamshīd al-Kāshī
- Ulugh Beg, also a mathematician
- Ali Qushji, also a mathematician and philosopher
- Al-Birjandi
- Taqi al-Din Muhammad ibn Ma'ruf, Ottoman astronomer
- Ahmad Nahavandi
- Ahmad Khani
- Haly Abenragel
- Abolfadl Harawi

== See also ==
- Astrology in the medieval Islamic world
- History of astronomy

== Sources ==
- Dallal, Ahmad (1999). "Science, Medicine and Technology". In Esposito, John (ed.). The Oxford History of Islam. New York: Oxford University Press. ISBN 978-01951-0-799-9.
- Dallal, Ahmad (2010). Islam, Science, and the Challenge of History. Yale University Press. ISBN 978-0-300-15911-0.
- Hill, Donald R. (May 1991), "Mechanical Engineering in the Medieval Near East", Scientific American, 264 (5): 64–69, Bibcode:1991SciAm.264e.100H, doi:10.1038/scientificamerican0591-100
- Hill, Donald R. (1993). Islamic Science And Engineering. Edinburgh University Press. ISBN 978-0-7486-0455-5.
- Hoskin, Michael (1999). The Cambridge Concise History of Astronomy. Cambridge: Cambridge University Press. ISBN 978-0-521-57600-0.
- Huff, Toby (1993). The Rise of Early Modern Science: Islam, China, and the West. Cambridge University Press. ISBN 978-0-521-52994-5.
- Janos, Damien (2010). "Al-Fārābī on the Method of Astronomy". Early Science and Medicine. Early Science and Medicine 15, no. 3 (2010) (3): 237–65. doi:10.1163/157338210X493941. ISSN 1383-7427. JSTOR 20750216.
- King, David A. (1996). "Islamic Astronomy". In Walker, Christopher (ed.). Astronomy before the Telescope. British Museum. pp. 143–174. ISBN 978-0-7141-2733-0.
- King, David A. (2005). In Synchrony with the Heavens, Studies in Astronomical Timekeeping and Instrumentation in Medieval Islamic Civilization: The Call of the Muezzin. Vol. 1. Brill Publishers. ISBN 978-90-04-14188-9.
- Nasr, Seyyed H. (1993) [1964]. An Introduction to Islamic Cosmological Doctrines (2nd ed.). State University of New York Press. ISBN 978-0-7914-1515-3.
- Ragep, F. Jamil (2001b). "Freeing Astronomy from Philosophy: An Aspect of Islamic Influence on Science". Osiris. 2nd. 16: 49–71. Bibcode:2001Osir...16...49R. doi:10.1086/649338. S2CID 142586786.
- Sabra, A. I. (1998). "Configuring the Universe: Aporetic, Problem Solving, and Kinematic Modeling as Themes of Arabic Astronomy". Perspectives on Science. 6 (3): 288–330. doi:10.1162/posc_a_00552. S2CID 117426616.
- Sachau, Edward, ed. (1910). Alberuni's India: An Account of the Religion, Philosophy, Literature, Geography, Chronology, Astronomy, Customs, Laws and Astrology of India about A.D. 1030. Vol. 1. London: Kegan Paul, Trench, Trübner.
- Saliba, George (September 1993). "Al-Qushjī's Reform of the Ptolemaic Model for Mercury". Arabic Sciences and Philosophy. 3 (2): 161–203. doi:10.1017/s0957423900001776. ISSN 0957-4239. S2CID 170118014.
- Samsó, Julio (2007). "Biṭrūjī: Nūr al-Dīn Abū Isḥāq [Abū Jaʿfar] Ibrāhīm ibn Yūsuf al-Biṭrūjī". In Thomas Hockey; et al. (eds.). The Biographical Encyclopedia of Astronomers. New York: Springer. pp. 133–134. ISBN 978-0-387-31022-0. (PDF version)
- Samsó, Julio (1980). "Al-Bitruji Al-Ishbili, Abu Ishaq". Dictionary of Scientific Biography. New York: Charles Scribner's Sons. ISBN 978-0-684-10114-9.
- Sidoli, Nathan (2020). Mathematical Methods in Ptolemy's Analemma. In Ptolemy's Science of the Stars in the Middle Ages. Ptolemaeus Arabus et Latinus. Vol. Studies 1. Brepols Publishers. pp. 1:35–77. doi:10.1484/M.PALS-EB.5.120173. S2CID 242599669.

=== Further reading ===
- Ajram, K. (1992), "Appendix B", Miracle of Islamic Science, Knowledge House Publishers, ISBN 978-0-911119-43-5
- Kennedy, Edward S. (1998). Astronomy and Astrology in the Medieval Islamic World. Brookfield, VT: Ashgate. ISBN 978-0-86078-682-5.
- Gill, M. (2005), Was Muslim Astronomy the Harbinger of Copernicanism?, archived from the original on 2 January 2008
- Gingerich, Owen (1986). "Islamic astronomy". Scientific American. 254 (10): 74. Bibcode:1986SciAm.254d..74G. doi:10.1038/scientificamerican0486-74.
- Hassan, Ahmad Y., Transfer Of Islamic Technology To The West, Part II: Transmission Of Islamic Engineering, archived from the original on 18 February 2008
- King, David A. (1983), "The Astronomy of the Mamluks", Isis, 74 (4): 531–555, doi:10.1086/353360, S2CID 144315162
- King, David A. (1986), Islamic mathematical astronomy, London, ISBN 978-0-86078-407-4
- King, David A. (2005), In Synchrony with the Heavens, Studies in Astronomical Timekeeping and Instrumentation in Medieval Islamic Civilization, vol. 2: Instruments of Mass Calculation, Brill Publishers, ISBN 978-90-04-14188-9
- Lindberg, D.C., and M. H. Shank, eds. The Cambridge History of Science. Volume 2: Medieval Science (Cambridge UP, 2013), chapter 4 covers astronomy in Islam.
- Rashed, Roshdi; Morelon, Régis (1996), Encyclopedia of the History of Arabic Science, 1, vol. & 3, Routledge, ISBN 978-0-415-12410-2
- Saliba, George (1994a), "Early Arabic Critique of Ptolemaic Cosmology: A Ninth-Century Text on the Motion of the Celestial Spheres", Journal for the History of Astronomy, 25 (2): 115–141, Bibcode:1994JHA....25..115S, doi:10.1177/002182869402500205, S2CID 122647517
- Saliba, George (1994b). A History of Arabic Astronomy: Planetary Theories During the Golden Age of Islam. New York University Press. ISBN 978-0-8147-8023-7.
- Saliba, George (1999). "Whose Science is Arabic Science in Renaissance Europe?". Columbia University.
- Saliba, George (2000), "Arabic versus Greek Astronomy: A Debate over the Foundations of Science", Perspectives on Science, 8 (4): 328–341, doi:10.1162/106361400753373713, S2CID 57562913
