= Zabit =

Arabic masculine given name

Zabit (Arabic: زابيت; Russian: Забит) is a central-Asian masculine surname of Arabic origin. It may refer to:

- Zabit Magomedsharipov (born 1991), Russian mixed martial artist of Avar ethnicity
- Zabit Samedov (born 1984), Azerbaijani kickboxer

== See also ==
- Sabit
