= Ibn al-A'lam =

Arab astronomer and astrologer

'Alī ibn al-Ḥusayn Abū l-Qasim al-'Alawi Ashraf al-Sharif al-Husayni, (Arabic: ابن الأعلم الشريف الحسيني), (died in Baghdad, 985), was a 10th-century Islamic astronomer and astrologer.

Little is known about Ibn al-A'lam's life, and his birth date has not been established by historians. He seems to have been one of the most prominent astronomers of the 10th century, demonstrated by the impact he had on Islamic and Byzantine astronomy. He appears to have been active in Baghdad, working under the patronage of its Buyid ruler, 'Adud al-Dawla (978–983). His Nisba "al-Alawi al-Sharif" indicates that he was a Sharif and a descendant of Ja’far al-Tayyar.

Ibn al-A'lam's main work, a zīj, also known as "al-Zīj al-Sharīfi" or "al-Zīj al-Baghdādi", was named after his patron al-Zīj al-'Aḍudī. The work is lost, but scholars have been able to reconstruct most of it from Arabic, Persian, and Greek sources.

Ibn Yunus, the renowned 10th century Egyptian astronomer, was a contemporary to Ibn al-A'lam, whose work he praised and cited. After Ibn al-A'lam's death in 985, his influence remained for at least three centuries, as evidenced by the tables of the Maragheh observatory which were largely based on his work and that of the Egyptian astronomer Ibn Yunus.
