= Book on the Measurement of Plane and Spherical Figures =

Mathematical treatise by the Banū Mūsā

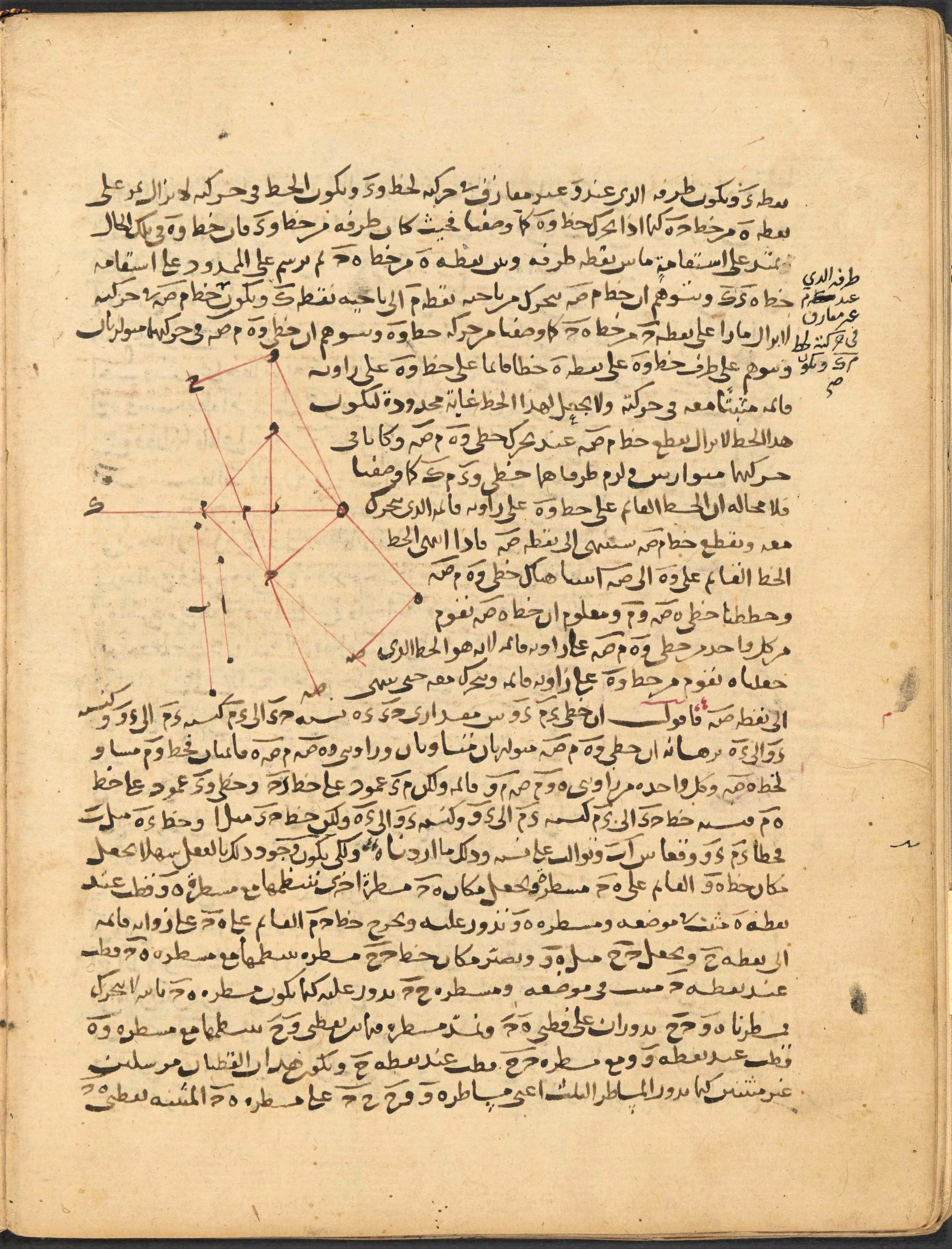
A page of the Book on the Measurement of Plane and Spherical Figures, Columbia University, New York

The Book on the Measurement of Plane and Spherical Figures (Arabic: كتاب معرفة مساحة الأشكال البسيطة والكريّة, Kitāb maʿrifah masāḥat al-ashkāl al-basīṭah wa-al-kuriyyah) (Note: The work is also known as the Kitāb maʿrifaẗ masāḥaẗ al-aškāl al-basīṭaẗ wa-al-kuriyyaẗ.) was the most important of the works produced by the Banū Mūsā (three 9th century Persian brothers who worked in Baghdad). A Latin translation by the 12th century Italian astrologer Gerard of Cremona was made, entitled Liber trium fratrum de geometria and Verba filiorum Moysi filii Sekir. The original work in Arabic was edited by the Persian polymath Naṣīr al-Dīn al-Ṭūsī in the 13th century. The original work in Arabic is not extant, but its contents are known from later translations.

The treatise, which is about geometry, was similar to two books by Archimedes, On the measurement of the circle and On the sphere and the cylinder. It was used extensively in the Middle Ages, and was quoted by authors such as Thābit ibn Qurra, Ibn al-Haytham, Leonardo Fibonacci (in his Practica geometriae), Jordanus de Nemore, and Roger Bacon. It deals with the geometrical concepts of area and volume, angle trisection, construction, and conic sections. It includes theorems not known to the Greeks.

The book was re-published in Latin with an English translation by the American historian Marshall Clagett, who has also summarized how the work influenced mathematicians during the Middle Ages.

== See also ==
- Mathematics in the medieval Islamic world

== Sources ==
- Casulleras, Josep (2007). "Banū Mūsā". In Hockey, Thomas; et al. (eds.). Biographical Encyclopedia of Astronomers. Springer Publishers. pp. 92–94. doi:10.1007/978-0-387-30400-7_1433. ISBN 978-0-387-31022-0. (PDF version)
- al-Dabbagh, J. (1970). "Banū Mūsā". In Gillispie, Charles Coulston; Holmes, Frederic Lawrence (eds.). Dictionary of Scientific Biography. Vol. 1. New York: Scribner. ISBN 978-0-684-10114-9. OCLC 755137603.
- Papadopoulos, Athanase (2016). "Roshdi Rashed, Historian of Greek and Arabic Mathematics". Ganita Bharatı (Indian Mathematics). 38 (2). The Indian Society for History of Mathematics: 1–26.
- Pascual, Lluís (2015). "An Archimedean Proposition Presented by the Brothers Banū Mūsā and Recovered in the Kitāb al-Istikmāl (eleventh century)" (PDF). Suhayl. International Journal for the History of the Exact and Natural Sciences in Islamic Civilisation. 14: 115–143. ISSN 2013-620X.
- Pingree, David (1988). "Banū Mūsā". Encyclopædia Iranica.
