= Mūsā ibn Shākir =

Iranian mathematician and astronomer

Mūsā ibn Shākir (Arabic: موسى بن شاكر) was the father of the three Banū Mūsā ("Sons of Musa") brothers, the renowned 9th-century scholars of Baghdad. Earlier in life, he had been a highwayman and astronomer in Khorasan and was a Persian. After befriending al-Maʾmūn, who was then a governor of Khorasan and staying in Marw, Musa was employed as an astrologer and astronomer. When he died, he left his three sons in the custody of Al-Ma'mun.

== See also ==
- List of Iranian scientists and scholars
