= Muḥammad ibn Mūsā =

Muḥammad ibn Mūsā can refer to:

- Muḥammad ibn Mūsā al-Khwārizmī, 9th century mathematician
- Muḥammad ibn Mūsā ibn Shākir, 9th century scientist, eldest of the Banū Mūsā
