= Khuzayma ibn Thabit =

Companion of Muhammad

Khuzayma ibn Thabit Dhu al-Shahadatayn al-Ansari (Arabic: خزيمة بن ثابت ذو الشهادتين الأنصاري, romanized: Khuzayma ibn Thābit Dhū al-Shahādatayn al-Anṣārī; d. July 657) was one of the companions of the Islamic prophet, Muhammad.

== Biography ==
=== 610–632: Muhammad's era ===
He was an Ansar and one among those on whose authority the Hadith of the pond of Khumm was reported.

=== 644–656: Uthman's era ===
Uthman ibn Affan told the sahaba to gather the Quran so they can compile it into an official book. Up to that point, it was memorized by the sahaba and kept together written on various materials. One complete copy was available with Hafsa which was prepared during First Caliph Abu Bakr.

In the Itqan, Al-Suyuti discussed the number of witnesses required for writing down a revelation of Muhammad.

=== 656–661: First Civil War ===
He died in the Battle of Siffin (657),

== See also ==
- Thabit (name)
