= Encyclopedia of the History of Arabic Science =

1996 book by Roshdi Rashed

- Author: (eds.) Roshdi Rashed with Régis Morelon
- Language: English
- Publisher: Routledge
- Publication date: May 1996
- Publication place: United Kingdom
- ISBN: 0-415-02063-8
- OCLC: 185762373
- Dewey Decimal: 509/.17/4927 21
- LC Class: Q127.A5 E53 2000

The Encyclopedia of the History of Arabic Science is a three-volume encyclopedia covering the history of Arabic contributions to science, mathematics and technology which had a marked influence on the Middle Ages in Europe. It is written by internationally recognized experts in the field and edited by Roshdi Rashed in collaboration with Régis Morelon.

Volume one covers "Astronomy—Theoretical and applied". Volume two covers "Mathematics and the Physical Sciences". Volume three covers "Technology, Alchemy, and the Life Sciences".

== Editions ==
- French edition: "fr:Histoire des sciences arabes", 3 vol., Le Seuil, Paris, 1997, (ISBN 2-02-030355-8).
- Arabic edition: "Mawsu‘a Tarikh al-‘ulum al-‘arabiyya", 3 vol., Markaz Dirasat al-Wahda al-‘arabiyya, Beirut, 1997, (ISBN 9953-450-73-0, 978-9953-450-73-5).

== Contributors ==
A partial list of contributors include:

Volume 1

- R. Morelon and George Saliba (Arabic astronomy)
- David A. King (astronomy in Islamic society)
- Edward Stewart Kennedy (mathematical geography)
- J. Vernet and J. Samsó (Arabic science in Andalusia)
- H. Grosset-Grange (Arabic nautical sciences)

Volume 2

- A. S. Saidan (numeration and arithmetic)
- Boris A. Rosenfeld and A. P. Yushkevich (geometry)
- J.-C. Chabrier and M. Rozhanskaya (music and statics)
- M.-Th. Debarnot (trigonometry, algebra)
- Roshdi Rashed (geometrical optics)
- G. Russell (physiological optics)

Volume 3

- Donald Routledge Hill (engineering)
- A. Miquel (geography)
- Toufic Fahd (botany and agriculture)
- G. Anawati (Arabic alchemy)
- E. Savage-Smith (medicine)
- F. Micheau (scientific institutions in the medieval Near East)
- J. Jolivet (classifications of the sciences)
- M. Mahdi (historiography)
- B. Goldstein (heritage of Arabic science in Hebrew)
- H. Hugonnard-Roche, A. Allard, D. Lindberg, R. Halleux, and D. Jacquart (Western reception of various Arabic sciences)
