= Sabi =

Sabi may refer to:

- A member of an ethnoreligious group known as the Mandaeans (Sabians), in Arabic
- Sabi (Korea), an ancient capital of Baekje
- Sabi (dog), an Australian special forces dog
- Save River (Africa), flows through Zimbabwe and Mozambique
- Sabi Forest Park, The Gambia
- Wabi-sabi, a Japanese aesthetic term
- Sabi (American singer), the stage name of American singer Jenice Portlock
- Sabi (Russian singer)
- Sabi Island, near the southern end of Myanmar
- Sabi Sabi, a private game reserve in South Africa
- Sabi languages, a group of Bantu languages
