= Sabit =

Sabit is an Arabic masculine given name, meaning "firmly in place”, “stable”, “unshakable”, "Nunuman" from Thabit (ثابت). Notable people with the name include:

- Sami Sabit Karaman (1877–1957), officer of the Ottoman Army and a general of the Turkish Army
- Sabit Damolla (1883–1934), Uyghur independence movement leader
- Sabit Lulo (1883-??), Albanian politician, active in the Ottoman Empire and Albania
- Sabit Noyan (1887–1967), officer of the Ottoman Army and the general of the Turkish Army
- Sabit Mukanov (1900–1973) poet, social activist, academic, head of the Writers' Union of Kazakhstan
- Sabit Orujov (1912–1981), Deputy Prime-minister of Azerbaijan SSR (1957–1959)
- Sabit Uka (1920–2006), Kosovar Albanian historian
- Sabit Osman Avcı (1921–2009), Turkish politician
- Sabit Dudu (1930–2022), Sudanese footballer
- Sabit Brokaj (1942–2020), Albanian physician and politician
- Ferdi Sabit Soyer (born 1952), former Prime Minister of the Turkish Republic of Northern Cyprus
- Sabit İnce (born 1954), Turkish poet and Islamist scholar
- Sabit Hadžić (1957–2018), former basketball player, competed for Yugoslavia in the Olympics
- Baptist Sabit Frances, South Sudanese politician

== See also ==
- Sabi (disambiguation)
- Sabieite
- Salbit
- Tsabit
