= Na'im ibn Musa =

Na‘īm ibn Mūsā (Arabic: نعيم بن موسى) was a mathematician of the Islamic Golden Age and a pupil of Thabit Ibn Qurra. Na'im was from Baghdad and lived in the second half of the 9th century. He was the son of Muḥammad ibn Mūsā ibn Shākir, the oldest of the three brothers Banu Musa.

== Collection of geometrical propositions ==
Marco Panza, a historian of his works, states that "he was probably not a major mathematician". His treatise Collection of geometrical propositions was "one of the first examples of a particular kind of mathematical treatises that became quite usual during the 10th century, and it reflects quite well 'the mathematical culture' of a 9th-century Baghdadi mathematician educated at Thabit ibn Qurra’s school". Only one copy of this work is known, preserved at the University Library of Istanbul. The treatise was edited and translated to French by Roshdi Rashed and Christian Houzel.

== See also ==
- Banu Musa, his father and two uncles

== Sources ==
- Rashed, Roshdi; Houzel, Christian (2004). Recherche et enseignement des mathématiques au IXe siècle : le recueil de propositions géométriques de Na"īm ibn Mūsā (in French). Louvain: Peeters. ISBN 978-90-429-1496-4.
