= Sabi Forest Park =

- IUCN category IV (habitat/species management area)
- Interactive map of Sabi Forest Park
- Location: Upper River Division Gambia
- Nearest city: Basse Santa Su
- Coordinates: 13°16′23″N 14°12′2″W
- Area: 73 ha (180 acres)
- Established: January 1, 1954

Sabi Forest Park is a forest park in the Gambia. Established on January 1, 1954, it covers 73 hectares. It belongs to the Uper River Region (URR) and is about 5 kilometers from Basse Santa Su, which is the administrative seat of the region.

It is located at an altitude of 51 meters.
