= Sanad ibn Ali =

9th-century Iraqi mathematician

- Died: 864 AD
- Occupations: Astronomer, translator, mathematician, engineer
- Notable work: Zij al-Sindhind, Decimal mark
- Father: Ali-Musa

Abu al-Tayyib Sanad ibn Ali, also known as Sind ibn Ali (died c. 864 C.E.), was a ninth-century astronomer, translator, mathematician and engineer during Islamic Golden Age who was employed at the court of the Abbasid caliph Al-Ma'mun. A later convert to Islam, Sanad's father was a learned astronomer who lived and worked in Baghdad.

== Biography ==
Sanad ibn Ali was either an Iraqi Jewish or a Sindhi from Mansura, capital of Arab Sind. He is known to have translated and modified the Zij al-Sindhind. The Zij al-Sindhind was the first astronomical table ever introduced in the Muslim World. As a mathematician Sanad ibn ʿAlī was a colleague of al-Khwarizmi and worked closely with Yaqūb ibn Tāriq together they calculated the diameter of the Earth and other astronomical bodies. He also wrote a commentary on Kitāb al-ğabr wa-l-muqābala and helped prove the works of al-Khwarizmi. The decimal point notation to the Arabic numerals was introduced by Sanad ibn Ali.

According to Ibn Abi Usaibia: the Banū Mūsā brothers out of sheer professional jealousy kept him away from Abbasid Caliph al-Mutawakkil at his new capital Samarra and had caused Sanad ibn ʿAlī to be sent away to Baghdad. Both Ja'far Muhammad ibn Mūsā ibn Shākir and Ahmad ibn Mūsā ibn Shākir delegated the work of digging a great canal instead to Al-Farghani and thus ignoring Sanad ibn ʿAlī, the better engineer. Al-Farghani committed a great error, making the beginning of the canal deeper than the rest and water never reached the new garrison of Al-Ja'fariya. News of this greatly angered al-Mutawakkil and the two Banū Mūsā brothers were saved from severe punishment only by the gracious willingness of Sanad ibn ʿAlī, to vouch the corrections of Al-Farghani's calculations thus risking his own welfare and possibly his life.
