= Tabit (town) =

- Town
- Location within Sudan
- Coordinates: 13.313°N 25.087°E
- Country: Sudan
- State: North Darfur

Population
  - Total: 7,000

Tabit, also spelled Thabit, is a town in North Darfur, Sudan. It has a population of 7,000 and lies thirty miles southwest of Al-Fashir. Most of the inhabitants belong to the Fur people.

In 2011, the surrounding area suffered intense conflict.

An investigation by Human Rights Watch (HRW) released in February 2015 said 221 were raped, which had also been reported days after the town was attacked but verification was difficult, by government soldiers in "a mass rape that could constitute crimes against humanity". Witnesses said three separate operations were carried out in 30 October to 1 November 2014. In addition to the rape of women and girls, they reported that property was looted, men arrested and residents beaten. The town had been controlled by rebel forces previously but HRW found no evidence that the rebel fighters were in or close to the town when it was attacked.
