= Perspectives on Science =

- Discipline: Philosophy and history of science
- Language: English
- Edited by: Alex Levine, Mordechai Feingold

Publication details
- History: 1993-present
- Publisher: MIT Press
- Frequency: Quarterly

Standard abbreviations
- ISO 4: Perspect. Sci.

Indexing
- ISSN: 1063-6145 (print); 1530-9274 (web)
- OCLC no.: 42413222

Links
- Journal homepage; Online access

Perspectives on Science is a peer-reviewed academic journal that publishes contributions to science studies that integrate historical, philosophical, and sociological perspectives. The journal contains theoretical essays, case studies, and review essays. Perspectives on Science was established in 1993 and is published online and in hard copy by the MIT Press.

== Abstracting and indexing ==
The journal is abstracted and indexed by the following bibliographic databases:

- Academic Search Premier
- America: History and Life
- BIOSIS
- Historical Abstracts
- IBZ Online
- International Bibliography of the Social Sciences
- Philosopher's Index
- Scopus
- Sociological Abstracts
- zbMATH
