= Ibn Yunus =

Egyptian mathematician (c. 950–1009)

- Born: Abu al-Hasan 'Ali Abi al-Said ibn 'Abd al-Rahman ibn Ahmad ibn Yunus bin Abd al-'Ala al-Sadafi al-Misri (أبو الحسن علي أبي السعيد بن عبد الرحمن بن أحمد بن يونس بن عبد الأعلى الصدفي المصري); 950; Fustat, Ikhshidid Emirate of Egypt, now Egypt
- Died: 6 June 1009; Cairo, Fatimid Caliphate, now Egypt
- Occupations: Astronomer, astrologer, mathematician, philosopher
- Era: Ikhshidid era Abbasid era Fatimid era
- Notable work: Al-Zij al-Kabir al-Hakimi; Bulugh al-Umniyya; Zij ibn Yunus; Ghayat al-Intifah fi Mareafat al-Da'ir min al-Falak min qabl al-Iritifah

Abu al-Hasan 'Ali ibn Abi al-Said 'Abd al-Rahman ibn Ahmad ibn Yunus ibn Abd al-'Ala al-Sadafi al-Misri (Arabic: ابن يونس; c. 950 – 1009) was an Arab and Egyptian astronomer and mathematician,. The Fatimids gave him gifts and established an observatory for him on Mount Mokattam near Fustat. Al-Aziz Billah ordered him to make astronomical tables, which he completed during the reign of Al-Hakim bi-Amr Allah, son of Al-Aziz, and called it al-Zij al-Kabir al-Hakimi. The crater Ibn Yunus on the Moon is named after him.

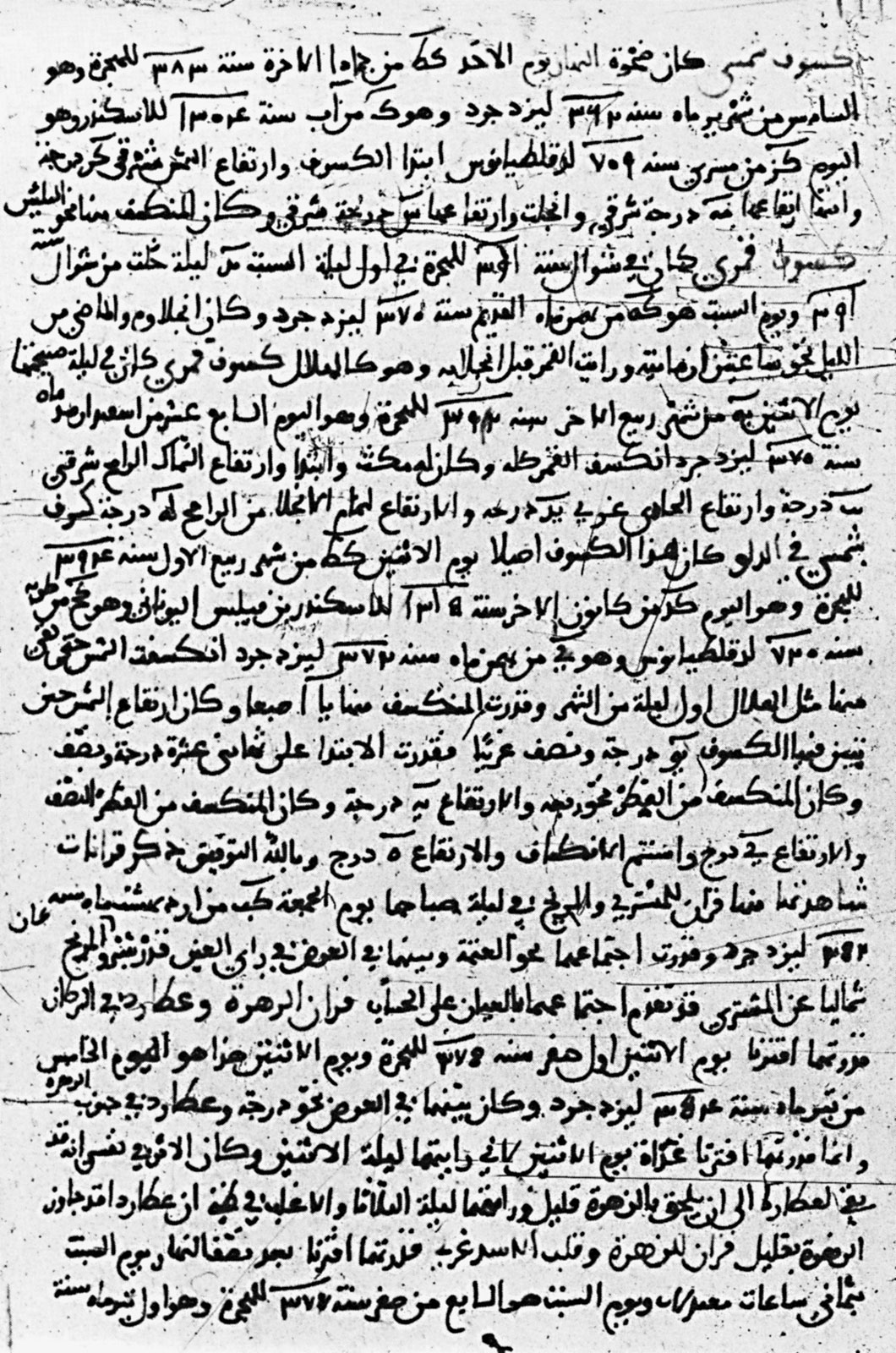
Ibn Yunus' records of the solar eclipses of 993 and 1004 as well as the lunar eclipses of 1001 and 1002.

== Life ==
Information regarding his early life and education is uncertain. He was born in Egypt between 950 and 952 and came from a respected family in Fustat belonging to the Yemeni Arab tribe of Sadaf, a branch traditionally traced to Ḥimyar. His father was a historian, biographer, and scholar of hadith who wrote two volumes about the history of Egypt, one about the Egyptians and one based on traveller commentary on Egypt. A prolific writer, ibn Yunus' father has been described as "Egypt's most celebrated early historian and first known compiler of a biographical dictionary devoted exclusively to Egyptians". His grandfather was also a scholar who specialized in astronomy, and Ibn Yunus enjoyed great prestige among the Fatimid caliphs, who encouraged him to pursue his astronomical and mathematical research. They built an observatory for him near Fustat (Cairo), and equipped it with all the necessary machinery and tools. Sarton says of him that he was perhaps the greatest Muslim astronomer. His great-grandfather had been an associate of the noted legal scholar al-Shafi'i.

Early in the life of ibn Yunus, the Fatimid dynasty came to power and the new city of Cairo was founded. In Cairo, he worked as an astronomer for the Fatimid dynasty for twenty-six years, first for the Caliph Al-Aziz Billah and then for al-Hakim. Ibn Yunus dedicated his most famous astronomical work, al-Zij al-Kabir al-Hakimi, to the latter.

As well as for his mathematics, Ibn Yunus was also known as an eccentric and a poet.

== Works ==
One of his greatest astronomical works was that he calculated with great accuracy the inclination of the ecliptic circle, after observing the solar and lunar eclipses.

Ibn Yunus excelled in trigonometry, and he was the first to solve some of the trigonometric equations that are used in astronomy, and he conducted valuable research in it that helped advance trigonometry. He was the first to establish a law for spherical trigonometry, and it was of great importance to scholars of astronomy, before the discovery of logarithms, since by means of that law multiplication operations in trigonometry could be converted into addition operations, it facilitated the solution of many long and complex problems.

Ibn Yunus showed great ingenuity in solving many difficult problems in astronomy.

Ibn Yunus observed the eclipse of the sun and moon in Cairo in 978 AD, and his calculation came closest to what was known, until modern observing machines appeared.

=== Astrology ===
In astrology, noted for making predictions and having written the Kitab bulugh al-umniyya ("On the Attainment of Desire"), a work concerning the heliacal risings of Sirius, and on predictions concerning what day of the week the Coptic year will start on.

=== Astronomy ===
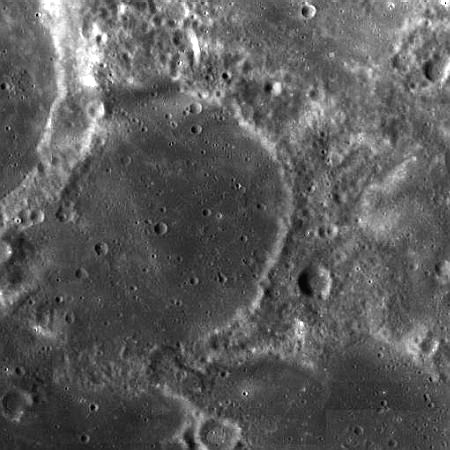
Ibn Yunus lunar crater, named after him

Ibn Yunus' most famous work in Islamic astronomy, al-Zij al-Kabir al-Hakimi (c. 1000), was a handbook of astronomical tables which contained very accurate observations, many of which may have been obtained with very large astronomical instruments. According to N. M. Swerdlow, the Zij al-Kabir al-Hakimi is "a work of outstanding originality of which just over half survives".

Yunus expressed the solutions in his zij without mathematical symbols, but Delambre noted in his 1819 translation of the Hakemite tables that two of Ibn Yunus' methods for determining the time from solar or stellar altitude were equivalent to the trigonometric identity $2\cos(a)\cos(b) = \cos(a+b)+\cos(a-b)$ identified in Johannes Werner's 16th-century manuscript on conic sections. Now recognized as one of Werner's formulas, it was essential for the development of prosthaphaeresis and logarithms decades later.

Ibn Yunus described 40 planetary conjunctions and 30 lunar eclipses. For example, he accurately describes the planetary conjunction that occurred in the year 1000 as follows:

A conjunction of Venus and Mercury in Gemini, observed in the western sky: The two planets were in conjunction after sunset on the night [of Sunday 19 May 1000]. The time was approximately eight equinoctial hours after midday on Sunday. Mercury was north of Venus and their latitude difference was a third of a degree.

Modern knowledge of the positions of the planets confirms that his description and his calculation of the distance being one-third of a degree is exactly correct. Ibn Yunus's observations on conjunctions and eclipses were used in Richard Dunthorne and Simon Newcombs' respective calculations of the secular acceleration of the Moon.

=== Pendulum ===
Recent encyclopaedias and popular accounts claim that the tenth century astronomer Ibn Yunus used a pendulum for time measurement, despite the fact that it has been known for nearly a hundred years that this is based on nothing more than an error made in 1684 by the Savilian Professor of Astronomy at Oxford Edward Bernard.

== Ibn Yunus's philosophy ==
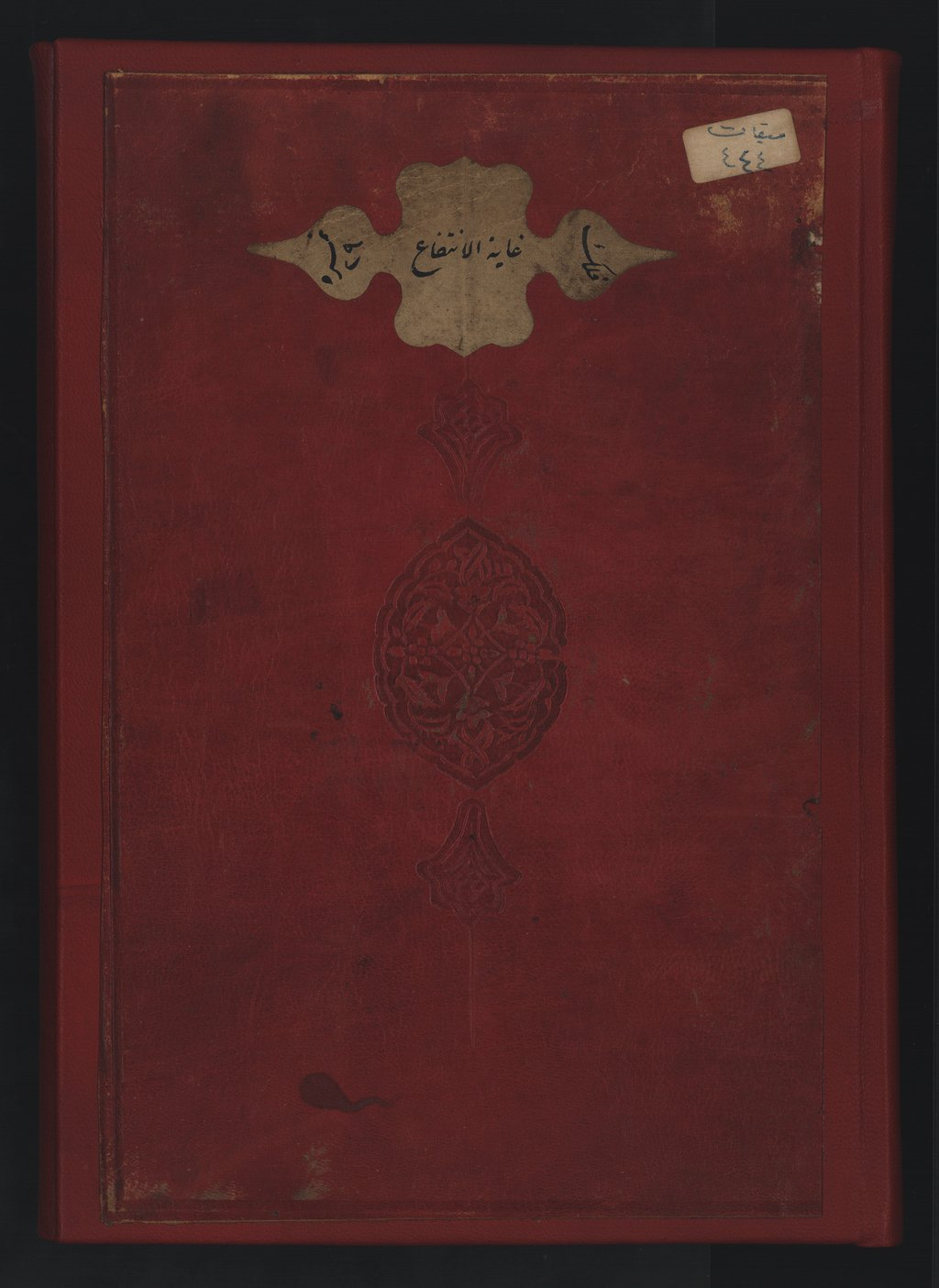
The book “Ghayat al-Intifah fi Mareafat al-Da'ir min al-Falak min qabl al-Iritifah” by the scholar Abu Al-Hasan Ali Ibn Yunus

In his scientific studies, he only believed in what his mind was convinced of, and he did not care what people said about him. His philosophy was summarized in three points:

- Adopting the scientific principle based on observation and measurement, and taking the universe and everything in it as a teacher, from which facts are deduced and to which they are returned.
- Strengthening faith by touching the signs of the Creator emanating in the universe.
- Practicing legitimate pleasures. (Ibn Khallikan mentions about one of the astrologers that he once went with him to Mount Mokattam, and he stopped to observe the planet Venus, so he took off his turban and dress and put on a red shirt and a red mask to cover himself with. He took out a stick and struck it with incense in his hands, and his situation was bizarre).

== Narration of Hadith ==
Ibn Yunus narrated hadiths and reports from his father, Abi al-Sa'id, but the scholars rejected his narration due to his preoccupation with astrology and magic.

== Books ==
Ibn Yunus had many works, and his most important book is Al-Zij Al-Kabir Al-Hakimi, which is the book he began writing, by order of the Fatimid Caliph Al-Aziz in the year 380 AH/990 AD, and completed it in 1007 AD during the reign of Caliph Al-Hakim Ould Al-Aziz, and he called it Al-Zij Al-Hakimi, after the caliph.

The word Zij is a Persian word (Zik), and its meaning in our modern sense is mathematical astronomical tables. He had another book called Zij Ibn Yunus, and the numbers he included in his two zij books are correct up to the seventh decimal number, which indicates unparalleled mathematical accuracy in calculations, and many astronomers have been transmitted from him, especially after his zij moved to the East, and the Egyptians relied on their calendars on Ibn Yunus’ zij for a long period of time.
