= Thābit ibn Qurra =

Medieval Sabian scholar (c. 830–901)

- Born: 210-211 AH/220-221 AH / 826 or 836 AD; Harran, the Jazira (Upper Mesopotamia) (now in Şanlıurfa Province)
- Died: Wednesday, 26 Safar, 288 AH / February 19, 901 AD; Baghdad, Lower Mesopotamia

Academic background
- Influences: Banu Musa, Archimedes, Apollonius, Nicomachus, Euclid

Academic work
- Era: Islamic Golden Age
- Main interests: Mathematics, Mechanics, Astronomy, Astrology, Translation, Number theory
- Notable ideas: Early reformer of the Ptolemaic system; A founder of statics; Length of the sidereal year
- Influenced: al-Khazini, al-Isfizari, Na'im ibn Musa

Thābit ibn Qurra (full name: Abū al-Ḥasan Ṯābit ibn Qurra ibn Zahrūn al-Ḥarrānī al-Ṣābiʾ, Arabic: أبو الحسن ثابت بن قرة بن زهرون الحراني الصابئ, Latin: Thebit/Thebith/Tebit; 826 or 836 – February 19, 901), was a pagan Sabian scholar known for his work in mathematics, medicine, astronomy, and translation. He lived in Baghdad in the second half of the ninth century during the time of the Abbasid Caliphate.

Thābit ibn Qurra made important discoveries in algebra, geometry, and astronomy. In astronomy, Thābit is considered one of the first reformers of the Ptolemaic system, and in mechanics he was a founder of statics. Thābit also wrote extensively on medicine and produced philosophical treatises.

== Biography ==
al-Jazira region and its subdivisions (Diyar Bakr, Diyar Mudar, and Diyar Rabi'a) during the Abbasid Caliphate

Thābit was born in Harran in Upper Mesopotamia, which at the time was part of the Diyar Mudar subdivision of the al-Jazira region of the Abbasid Caliphate. Thābit was a native speaker of Syriac, the Aramaic dialect of Edessa, and belonged to the Sabians of Harran, a Hellenized Semitic polytheistic astral religion that still existed in ninth-century Harran. The ʿAbbāsid court employed many non-Arab scholars learned both in Arabic and the language of their communities such as Aramaic, Persian and Greek.

According to Ibn al-Nadim, Thābit worked as a money changer in a marketplace in Harran before meeting Muḥammad ibn Mūsā, the oldest of three mathematicians and astronomers known as the Banū Mūsā; Tamara Green has questioned this detail, arguing that the breadth of Thābit's later command of Greek science points to extensive prior academic training rather than a background in trade. Muslim sources report that Thābit had quarreled with his fellow Sabians in Harran over matters of doctrine. Under the patronage of Muḥammad ibn Mūsā, and at the invitation of the caliph, he relocated to Baghdad, where he founded a school staffed by fellow Harranians. Thābit displayed such exceptional linguistic skills that ibn Mūsā chose him to come to Baghdad to be trained in mathematics, astronomy, and philosophy under the tutelage of the Banū Mūsā. Here, Thābit was introduced to not only a community of scholars but also to those who had significant power and influence in Baghdad.

In Baghdad, Thābit is credited by Ibn al-Nadim's Fihrist with having "founded the leadership" (ri'āsa) of the pagans in the city and in the presence of the caliphs, after which the community achieved lasting recognition, standing, and prestige at court. He is reported to have continued to regard himself as protector of his coreligionists at Harran, interceding with the caliph on their behalf. According to the Syriac historian Bar Hebraeus, Thābit defended his ancestral religion in explicitly proud terms, declaring, "We are the heirs and transmitters of ḥanpūthā." Green suggests Thābit may have chosen this Syriac term, cognate with the Arabic ḥanīf, deliberately for its Qur'anic association with Abraham, linking the Harranian Sabians to the same original monotheistic faith the Qur'an attributes to the first ḥanīf.

Thābit and his pupils lived in the midst of the most intellectually vibrant, and probably the largest, city of the time, Baghdad. Thābit came to Baghdad in the first place to work for the Banū Mūsā becoming a part of their circle and helping them translate Greek mathematical texts. What is unknown is how Banū Mūsā and Thābit occupied himself with mathematics, astronomy, astrology, magic, mechanics, medicine, and philosophy. Later in his life, Thābit's patron was the Abbasid Caliph al-Mu'tadid (reigned 892–902), whom he became a court astronomer for. Thābit became the Caliph's personal friend and courtier. Thābit died in Baghdad in 901. His son, Sinan ibn Thabit and grandson, Ibrahim ibn Sinan would also make contributions to the medicine and science. By the end of his life, Thābit had managed to write 150 works on mathematics, astronomy, and medicine. With all the work done by Thābit, most of his work has not lasted time. There are less than a dozen works by him that have survived.

== Translation ==
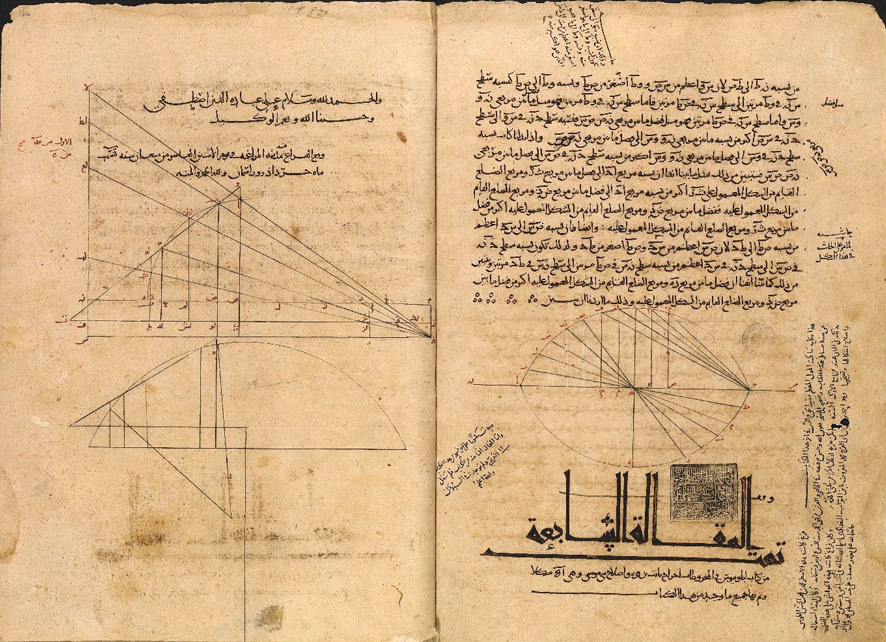
Pages from Thābit's Arabic translation of Apollonius' Conics

Thābit's native language was Syriac, which was the Middle Aramaic variety from Edessa, and he was fluent in both Medieval Greek and Arabic. He was the author to multiple treaties. Due to him being trilingual, Thābit was able to have a major role during the Graeco-Arabic translation movement. He would also make a school of translation in Baghdad.

Thābit translated from Greek into Arabic works by Apollonius of Perga, Archimedes, Euclid and Ptolemy. He revised the translation of Euclid's Elements of Hunayn ibn Ishaq. He also rewrote Ishaq ibn Hunayn's translation of Ptolemy's Almagest and translated Ptolemy's Geography. Thābit's translation of a work by Archimedes, which gave a construction of a regular heptagon, was discovered in the 20th century, the original having been lost.

== Astronomy ==
Thābit is believed to have been an astronomer of Caliph al-Mu'tadid. Thābit was able to use his mathematical work on the examination of Ptolemaic astronomy. The medieval astronomical theory of the trepidation of the equinoxes is often attributed to Thābit. But it had already been described by Theon of Alexandria in his comments of the Handy Tables of Ptolemy. According to Copernicus, Thābit determined the length of the sidereal year as 365 days, 6 hours, 9 minutes and 12 seconds (an error of 2 seconds). Copernicus based his claim on the Latin text attributed to Thābit. Thābit published his observations of the Sun. In regards to Ptolemy's Planetary Hypotheses, Thābit examined the problems of the motion of the Sun and Moon, and the theory of sundials. When looking at Ptolemy's Hypotheses, Thābit ibn Qurra found the Sidereal year which is when looking at the Earth and measuring it against the background of fixed stars, it will have a constant value.

Thābit was also an author and wrote De Anno Solis. This book contained and recorded facts about the evolution in astronomy in the ninth century. Thābit mentioned in the book that Ptolemy and Hipparchus believed that the movement of stars is consistent with the movement commonly found in planets. What Thābit believed is that this idea can be broadened to include the Sun and Moon. With that in mind, he also thought that the solar year should be calculated by looking at the Sun's return to a given star.

== Mathematics ==
In mathematics, Thābit derived an equation for determining amicable numbers. His proof of this rule is presented in the Treatise on the Derivation of the Amicable Numbers in an Easy Way. This was done while writing on the theory of numbers, extending their use to describe the ratios between geometrical quantities, a step which the Greeks did not take. Thābit's work on amicable numbers and number theory helped him to invest more heavily into the Geometrical relations of numbers establishing his transversal theorem.

Thābit described a generalized proof of the Pythagorean theorem. He provided a strengthened extension of Pythagoras' proof which included the knowledge of Euclid's fifth postulate. This postulate states that the intersection between two straight line segments combine to create two interior angles which are less than 180 degrees. The method of reduction and composition used by Thābit resulted in a combination and extension of contemporary and ancient knowledge on this famous proof. Thābit believed that geometry was tied with the equality and differences of magnitudes of lines and angles, as well as that ideas of motion (and ideas taken from physics more widely) should be integrated in geometry.

The continued work done on geometric relations and the resulting exponential series allowed Thābit to calculate multiple solutions to chessboard problems. This problem was less to do with the game itself, and more to do with the number of solutions or the nature of solutions possible. In Thābit's case, he worked with combinatorics to work on the permutations needed to win a game of chess.

In addition to Thābit's work on Euclidean geometry there is evidence that he was familiar with the geometry of Archimedes as well. His work with conic sections and the calculation of a paraboloid shape (cupola) show his proficiency as an Archimedean geometer. This is further embossed by Thābit's use of the Archimedean property in order to produce a rudimentary approximation of the volume of a paraboloid. The use of uneven sections, while relatively simple, does show a critical understanding of both Euclidean and Archimedean geometry. Thābit was also responsible for a commentary on Archimedes' Liber Assumpta.

== Physics ==
In physics, Thābit rejected the Peripatetic and Aristotelian notions of a "natural place" for each element. He instead proposed a theory of motion in which both the upward and downward motions are caused by weight, and that the order of the universe is a result of two competing attractions (jadhb): one of these being "between the sublunar and celestial elements", and the other being "between all parts of each element separately". and in mechanics he was a founder of statics. In addition, Thābit's Liber Karatonis contained proof of the law of the lever. This work was the result of combining Aristotelian and Archimedean ideas of dynamics and mechanics.

One of Qurra's most important pieces of text is his work with the Kitab fi 'l-qarastun. This text consists of Arabic mechanical tradition. Another piece of important text is Kitab fi sifat alwazn, which discussed concepts of equal-armed balance. Qurra was reportedly one of the first to write about the concept of equal-armed balance or at least to systematize the treatment.

Qurra sought to establish a relationship between forces of motion and the distance traveled by the mobile.

== Medicine ==
Thābit was well known as a physician and produced a substantial number of medical treatises and commentaries. His works included general reference books such as al-Dhakhira fī ilm al-tibb ("A Treasury of Medicine"), Kitāb al-Rawda fi l–tibb ("Book of the Garden of Medicine"), and al-Kunnash ("Collection"). He also produced specific works on topics such as gallstones; the treatment of diseases such as smallpox, measles, and conditions of the eye; and discussed veterinary medicine and the anatomy of birds. Thābit wrote commentaries on the works of Galen and others, including such works as On Plants (attributed to Aristotle but likely written by the first-century BC philosopher Nicolaus of Damascus).

One account of Thābit's work as a physician is given in Ibn al-Qiftī's Ta'rikh al-hukamā, where Thābit is credited with healing a butcher who was presumed to be certain to die.

== Works ==
Only a few of Thābit's works are preserved in their original form.

- On the Sector-Figure which deals with Menelaus' theorem.
- On the Composition of Ratios
- Kitab fi 'l-qarastun (Book of the Steelyard)
- Kitab fi sifat alwazn (Book on the Description of Weight) - Short text on equal-armed balance

Additional works by Thābit include:

- Kitāb al-Mafrūdāt (Book of Data)
- Maqāla fīistikhrāj al-a'dād al-mutahābba bi–suhūlat al-maslak ilā dhālika (Book on the Determination of Amicable Numbers)
- Kitāb fi Misāhat qat' almakhrūt alladhī yusammaā al-mukāfi' (Book on the Measurement of the Conic Section Called Parabolic)
- Kitāb fī Sanat al-shams (Book on the Solar Year)
- Qawl fi'l–Sabab alladhī ju'ilat lahu miyāh al-bahr māliha (Discourse on the Reason Why Seawater Is Salted)
- al-Dhakhira fī ilm al-tibb (A Treasury of Medicine)
- Kitāb fi 'ilm al-'ayn . . . (Book on the Science of the Eye…)
- Kitāb fi'l–jadarī wa'l–hasbā (Book on Smallpox and Measles)
- Masā'il su'ila 'anhā Thābit ibn Qurra al-Harrānī (Questions Posed to Thābit. . .)

In his epitome of al-Qifṭī's Kitāb ikhbār al-'ulamā' bi akhbār al-ḥukamā, al-Zawzanī lists seven religious works in Syriac by Thābit and says that he also wrote in Syriac on music and geometry. According to Bar Hebraeus, the 13th-century Syriac historian, Thābit wrote some 150 works in Arabic and 16 in Syriac. He claims to have seen most of the Syriac works himself and lists them. The list of Bar Hebraeus is consistent with that of al-Zawzanī. Most of the works concern pagan religion, but there is a work on music and two on geometry as well as a "book of the chronicle of the ancient Syrian kings, who are Chaldeans" and a "book on the renown of his race and his forefathers, from whom they descend".

== Eponyms ==
- Thabit number
- Thebit (crater)

== See also ==
- al-Battani, a contemporary Sabian astronomer and mathematician
