= Daimon =

Concept in ancient Greek religion

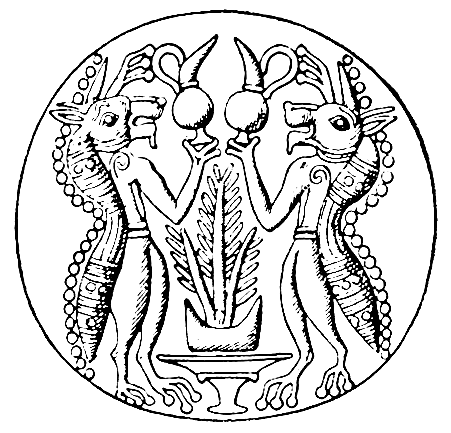
Two Minoan Genius performing a libation over an altar

In ancient Greek religion, daemon (Ancient Greek: δαίμων), also spelled daimon, often referred to lesser deities, but could more broadly signify "the experience of divine power". The term's etymology is unclear, though it is often thought to originate from daíō (δαίω, 'divide, distribute'). The Iliad describes the gods congregated atop Olympus as daimones; the term is employed by a Homeric character when they are unaware which deity is the agent of an event. In Hesiod's Works and Days it describes the souls of people from the Golden Age, who acted as guardians (phúlakes, φύλακες), leading to its denoting a spirit who positively or negatively influences an individual's life.

In Plato's Symposium, daimones are beings who sit somewhere between gods and men, an idea embraced by later authors. For Christian thinkers, the daemonic was associated with non-rational divine inspiration and, due to its lack of predictability, was considered evil. For modern non-Christian thinkers, such as Johann Wolfgang von Goethe, the daimon remained neutral. There is only one instance of daimon featuring in ancient Greek cult and art: in the form of Agathos Daimon ('Good Daimon').

== Etymology ==
According to Robert S. P. Beekes, the word is derived from Proto-Indo-European *deh₂-(i-) 'cut, divide'.

== Description ==
Daemons are lesser divinities or spirits, often personifications of abstract concepts, beings of the same nature as both mortals and deities, similar to ghosts, chthonic heroes, spirit guides, forces of nature, or the deities themselves (see Plato's Symposium). Even though the term derives from Greek philosophy, anthropology agrees that daemons are universal across human cultures. According to Hesiod's myth, "great and powerful figures were to be honoured after death as a daimon..." According to Walter Burkert, the term does not refer to a particular group of deities, but to a specific "mode of activity"; he describes daimon as the "necessary complement" to the individual and personal nature of the gods in Homeric epic, covering "that embar[r]assing remainder which eludes characterization and naming". According to the Animism-theory by Tylor and similar to William Robertson Smith's theory on totemism, belief in gods evolved from daimons — including ghosts and jinn — into gods.

In Hesiod's Theogony, Phaëton becomes an incorporeal daimon or a divine spirit, but, for example, the ills released by Pandora are deadly deities, keres, not daimones. From Hesiod also, the people of the Golden Age were transformed into daimones by the will of Zeus, to serve mortals benevolently as their guardian spirits; "good beings who dispense riches...[nevertheless], they remain invisible, known only by their acts". The daimones of venerated heroes were localized by the construction of shrines, so as not to wander restlessly, and were believed to confer protection and good fortune on those offering their respects.

One tradition of Greek thought, which found agreement in the mind of Plato, was of a daimon which existed within a person from their birth, and that each individual was obtained by a singular daimon prior to their birth by way of lot.

Plutarch writes that Opuntians had two priests: one appointed to oversee matters concerning the gods (τὰ θεῖα) and another responsible for rites concerning daimones (τὰ δαιμόνια).

== In mythology ==
Homer's use of the words theoí (θεοί, "gods") and daímones (δαίμονες) suggests that, while distinct, they are similar in kind. Later writers developed the distinction between the two. Plato in Cratylus speculates that the word daimōn (δαίμων, "deity") is synonymous to daēmōn (δαήμων, "knowing or wise"); however, it is more probably daiō (δαίω, "to divide, to distribute destinies, to allot").

=== Socrates ===
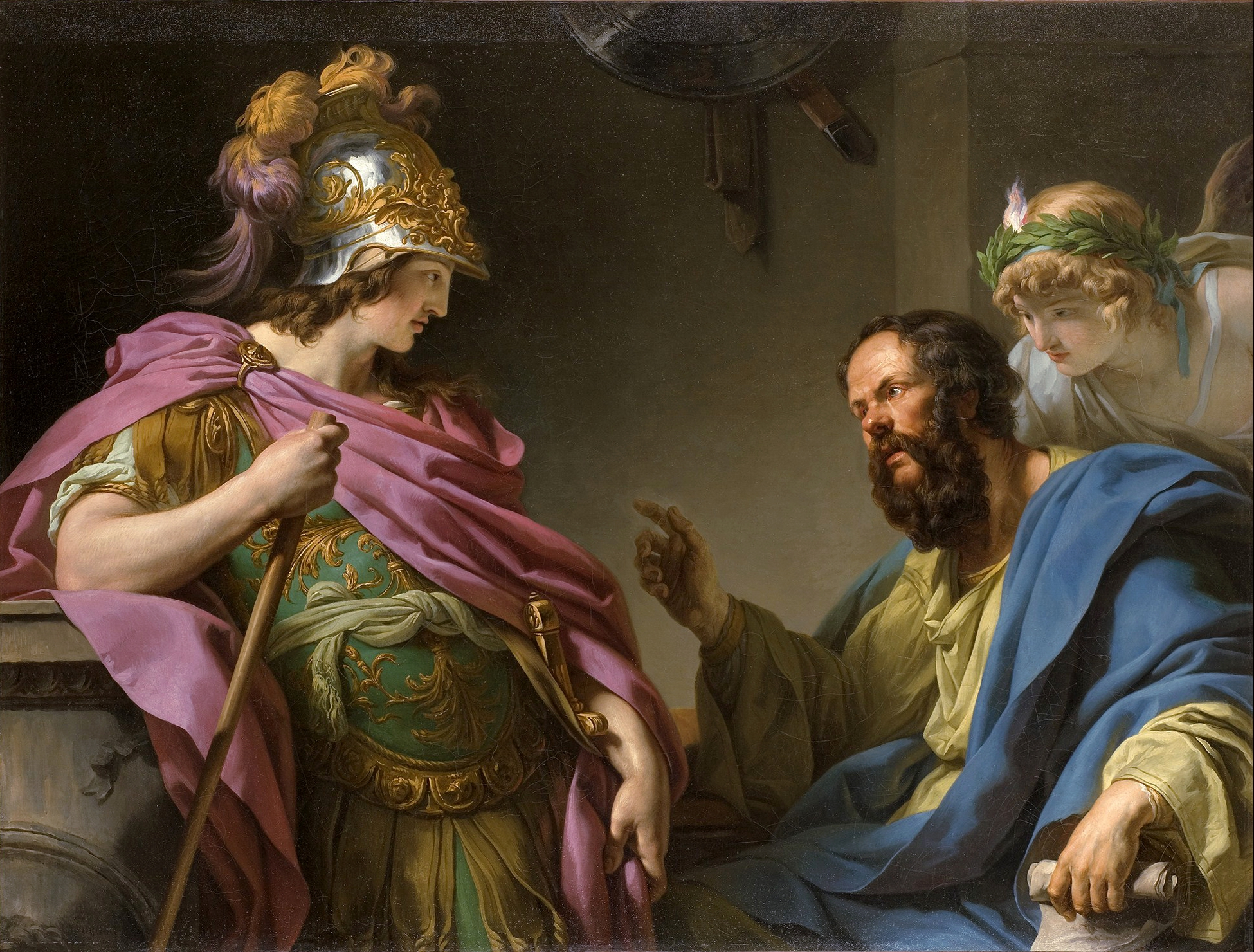
Socrates with Alcibiades and the Daimonion. Oil painting by François-André Vincent, 1776, in the Musée Fabre, Montpellier

In Plato's Symposium, the priestess Diotima teaches Socrates that love is not a deity, but rather a "great daimōn" (202d). She goes on to explain that "everything daimōnion is between divine and mortal" (202d–e), and she describes daimōns as "interpreting and transporting human things to the gods and divine things to men; entreaties and sacrifices from below, and ordinances and requitals from above..." (202e). In Plato's Apology of Socrates, Socrates claimed to have a daimōnion (literally, a "divine something") that frequently warned him—in the form of a "voice"—against mistakes but never told him what to do. The Platonic Socrates, however, never refers to the daimonion as a daimōn; it was always referred to as an impersonal "something" or "sign". By this term he seems to indicate the true nature of the human soul, his newfound self-consciousness. Paul Shorey sees the daimonion not as an inspiration but as "a kind of spiritual tact checking Socrates from any act opposed to his true moral and intellectual interests."

Regarding the charge brought against Socrates in 399 BC, Plato surmised "Socrates does wrong because he does not believe in the gods in whom the city believes, but introduces other daemonic beings..." Burkert notes that "a special being watches over each individual, a daimōn who has obtained the person at his birth by lot, is an idea which we find in Plato, undoubtedly from earlier tradition. The famous, paradoxical saying of Heraclitus is already directed against such a view: 'character is for man his daimon'".

== Categories ==
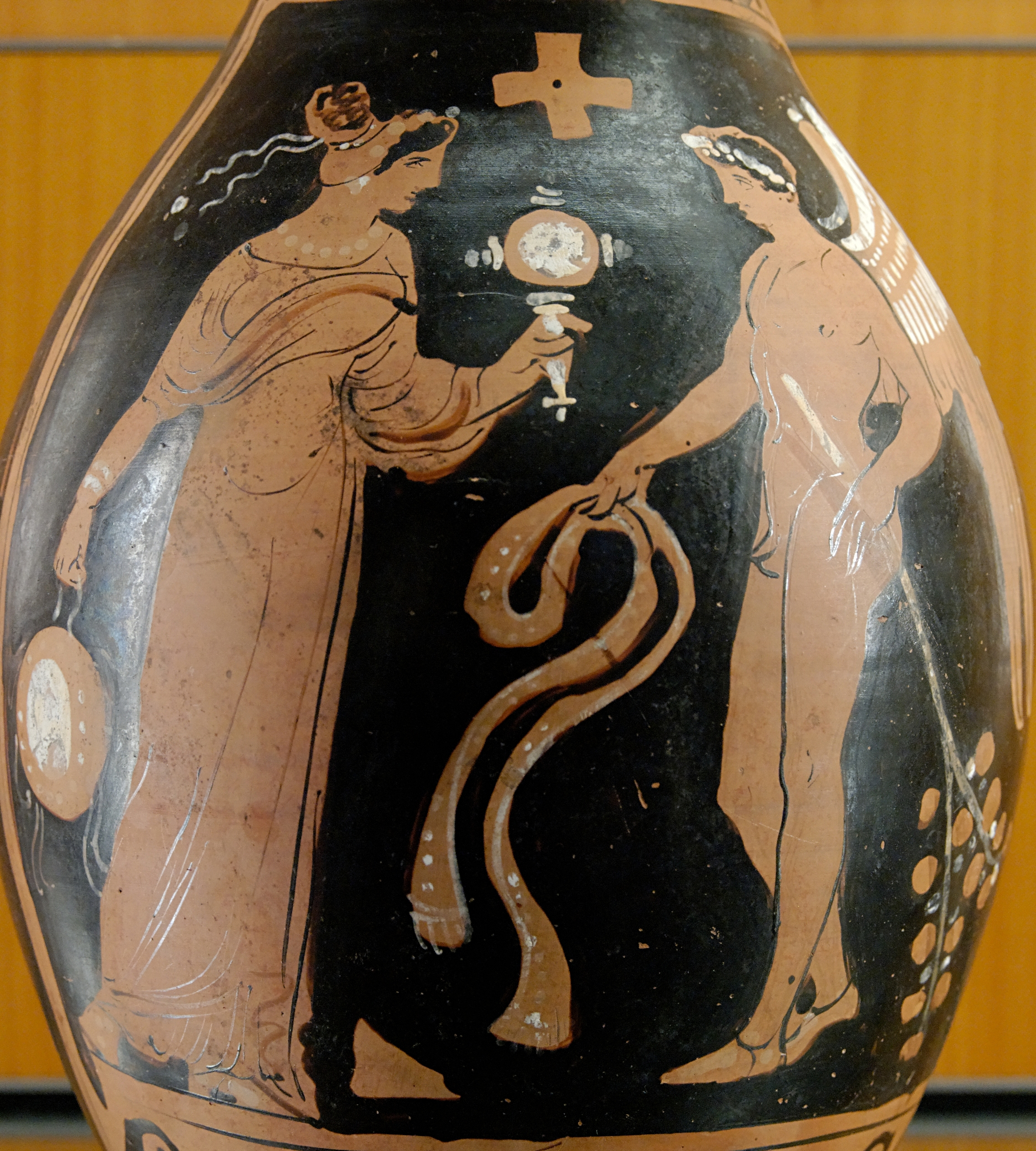
Winged genius facing a woman with a tambourine and mirror, from southern Italy, about 320 BC

The Hellenistic Greeks divided daemons into good and evil categories: agathodaímōn (ἀγαθοδαίμων, "noble spirit"), from agathós (ἀγαθός, "good, brave, noble, moral, lucky, useful"), and kakodaímōn (κακοδαίμων, "malevolent spirit"), from kakós (κακός, "bad, evil"). They resemble the Christian guardian angel and adversarial demon, respectively. Eudaimonia (εὐδαιμονία) came to mean "well-being" or "happiness". The comparable Roman concept is the genius who accompanies and protects a person or presides over a place (see genius loci).

A distorted view of Homer's daemon results from an anachronistic reading in light of later characterizations by Plato and Xenocrates, his successor as head of the Academy, who saw the daemon as a potentially dangerous lesser spirit: Burkert states that in the Symposium, Plato has "laid the foundation" to imagine the daimon as being with Eros, who as a mediator is neither god nor mortal but in between. His metaphysical doctrine of an

incorporeal, pure actuality, energeia ... identical to its performance: ‘thinking of thinking’, noesis noeseos is the most blessed existence, the highest origin of everything. ‘This is the god. On such a principle heaven depends, and the cosmos.’

In the monotheism of the mind, philosophical speculation has reached an end-point. ... In Plato there is an incipient tendency toward the apotheosis of nous. ... He needs a closeness and availability of the divine that is offered neither by the stars nor by metaphysical principles. Here a name emerged to fill the gap, a name which had always designated the incomprehensible yet present activity of a higher power, daimon.

Daemons scarcely figure in Greek mythology or Greek art; the exception is the agathodaemon, honored in ceremonial wine-drinking – especially at the sanctuary of Dionysus – and represented in art as a serpent. Burkert suggests that, for Plato, theology rests on two Forms: the Good and the Simple; which "Xenocrates unequivocally called the unity god" in sharp contrast to the poet's gods of epic and tragedy. Although much like the deities, these figures were not always depicted without considerable moral ambiguity:

Indeed, Xenocrates ... explicitly understood daemones as ranged along a scale from good to bad. ... [Plutarch] speaks of ‘great and strong beings in the atmosphere, malevolent and morose, who rejoice in [unlucky days, religious festivals involving violence against the self, etc.], and after gaining them as their lot, they turn to nothing worse.’ ... Quite when the point was first made remains unanswerable. Much the same thought as [Plato's] is to be found in a late Hellenistic composition, the Pythagorean Commentaries, which draws on older popular representations: ‘The whole air is full of souls. We call them daemones and heroes, and it is they who send dreams, signs and illnesses to men; and not only men, but also to sheep and other domestic animals. It is towards these daemones that we direct purifications and apotropaic rites, all kinds of divination, the art of reading chance utterances, and so on.’ ... This account differs from that of the early Academy in reaching back to the other, Archaic, view of daemones as souls, and thus anticipates the views of Plutarch and Apuleius in the Principate ... It clearly implies that daemones can cause illness to livestock: this traditional dominated view has now reached the intellectuals.

In the Archaic or early Classical period, the daimon had been democratized and internalized for each person, whom it served to guide, motivate, and inspire, as one possessed of such good spirits. Similarly, the first-century Roman imperial cult began by venerating the genius or numen of Augustus, a distinction that blurred in time.

== Age of Enlightenment ==
During the Age of Enlightenment, the daimon went through a revival. German polymath and writer Johann Wolfgang von Goethe (1749–1832), considers the daimonic to be neither necessarily good nor evil, neither divine, nor natural:

Er glaubte in der Natur, der belebten und unbelebten, der beseelten und unbeseelten, etwas zu entdecken, das sich nur in Wider sprüchen manifestierte und deshalb unter keinen Begriff, noch viel weniger unter ein Wort gefasst werden könnte. Es war nicht göttlich, denn es schien unver nünftig; nicht menschlich, denn es hatte keinen Verstand; nicht teuflisch, denn es war wohltätig; nicht englisch, denn es ließ oft Schadenfreude merken.

He believed he had discovered something in nature, both animate and inanimate, soulful and inanimate, that manifested itself only in contradictions and therefore could not be grasped by any concept, much less by a word. It was not divine, for it seemed irrational; not human, for it had no intellect; not diabolical, for it was benevolent; not angelic, for it often displayed malicious glee.

== See also ==
- Anito
- Anthelioi
- Eudaimon
- Fravashi
- Fylgja
- His Dark Materials
- Hyang
- Kami
- Koalemos
- Moral imperative
- Shoulder angel
- Unclean spirit
- Xian (Taoism)
- Yaksha
