= Agathodaemon of Alexandria =

2nd century Greek geographer and cartographer

Agathodaemon of Alexandria (Ancient Greek: Ἀγαθοδαίμων Ἀλεξανδρεὺς, Agathodaímōn Alexandreùs) was a Greek or Hellenized Egyptian cartographer, presumably from Alexandria, Roman Egypt, during late Antiquity, likely in the 2nd century AD.

Agathodaemon is mentioned in some of the earliest manuscripts of Ptolemy's Geography: (Note: Mason mentions manuscripts at Venice and Vienna without specifying which ones. Long mentions a third manuscript without specifying its location.)

Ἐκ τῶν Κλαυδίου Πτολεμαίου Γεογραφικῶν βιβλίων ὄκτο τὴν οἰκουμένην πᾶσαν Ἀγαθοδαίμων Ἀλεξανδρεὺς ὑπετύπωσε "From the eight books of geography of Claudius Ptolemaeus the whole habitable world Agathodaemon of Alexandria delineated."

The line appears in the running text of the Geography, not as a caption on the maps themselves. Since the inscriptions are the only surviving references to him and these manuscripts only survive from the very late 13th century, the most that can be conclusively stated is that he lived sometime between AD 150 and 1300, although his classical name and epithet—"the Alexandrian"—likely place him before the fall of Alexandria to the Caliphate in 641, rather than being contemporary with Maximus Planudes's reconstruction of the Ptolemaic atlas after 1295.

In the Geography, Ptolemy displays his familiarity with existing maps, criticizing inaccuracies introduced by other cartographers into Marinus of Tyre's work due to improper data. (Note: "...the duplication from the original into existing representations is likely to produce, from changes or small variations, remarkable anomalies. And if it should come to pass that there is no independent evidence unearthed for [the] method of map-making, then we are unable to find the proper image and helpless to reveal a solution. It has happened very many times with the maps of Marinus, they have not succeeded in completing a true copy of the original, attempting to do it offhand from commentaries and wrong data for the most part through collective agreement and the spreading abroad of misleading data...") Ptolemy attempted to remedy these errors by providing proper sample captions in his own books VII and VIII. In those sections, he explicitly mentions that his text was to be accompanied by maps constructed according to his principles. (Note: "We have made ten maps [πίνακες, pínakes] of Europe, four maps of Libya [i.e., Africa], and twelve maps of the whole of Asia.")

Heeren argued that Agathodaemon was the cartographer responsible for these original maps, while Dinse suggested he was the transcriber of the original papyrus scrolls into codices. Fischer proposed that Agathodaemon drafted only the world map but not the regional maps, based on differences in early manuscripts.

A major point of contention is that Ptolemy's regional maps use Marinus's cylindrical projection, which Ptolemy criticized, instead of either of Ptolemy's preferred projections. The world map, however, uses Ptolemy's less-favored projection.

Over time, numerous errors had crept into the copies of Agathodaemon's maps. Around 1470 AD, Nicolaus Germanus, a Benedictine monk, undertook their restoration and correction, replacing the original Greek names with Latin ones. His revised maps accompany the Ebnerian manuscript of Ptolemy and correspond in both number and general arrangement to those created by Agathodaemon.

Agathodaemon is sometimes conflated with two other figures: the 3rd-century alchemist Agathodaemon and the 5th-century grammarian Agathodaemon, who corresponded with Isidore of Pelusium.

== See also ==
- Claudius Ptolemy
- The Geography
- Ptolemy's world map
- The Canopic Branch of the Nile Delta, called the Agathodaemon by Ptolemy
- Other Agathodaemons
