= Agathodaemon (disambiguation) =

An agathodaemon or agathodaimon was a spirit of vineyards and grainfields in the religion of the ancient Greeks.

Agathodaemon or Agathodaimon may also refer to

- Set (deity), the Egyptian god
- The Canopic Branch of the Nile Delta, called the Agathodaemon or Agathodaimon in Ptolemy's Geography
- Agathodaemon (alchemist), the 3rd-century Egyptian alchemist
- Agathodaemon of Alexandria, an Egyptian cartographer of uncertain date connected with Ptolemy's Geography
  - Agathodaemon, a Martian canal named for the cartographer
- Agathodaemon (grammarian), the 5th-century Egyptian grammarian
- Agathodaimon (band), a German band playing death metal
- Agathos Daimon (boxer), who died in ancient Olympia aged 35 having promised Zeus victory or death
- Valles Marineris, a 4000-kilometre long canyon system on Mars, was named "Agathodaemon" in the old canal maps
