= Harranians =

Polytheistic astral religion of ancient Harran

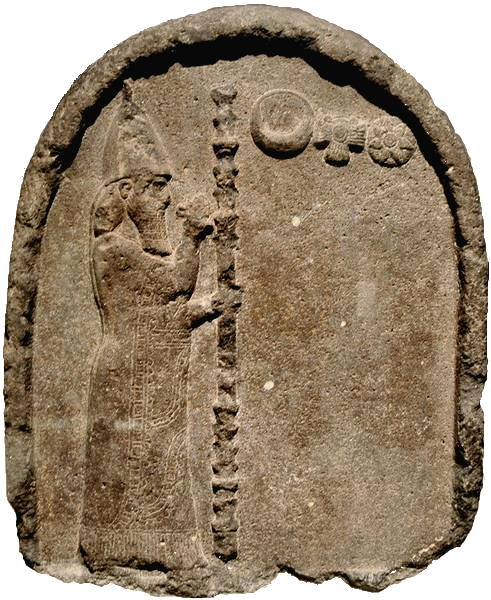
- Harran Stela, showing Nabonidus, last Neo-Babylonian king, worshipping the Sun, Ishtar (Venus), and the moon-god Sin
- Type: Ethnic religion
- Classification: Ancient Mesopotamian religion, paganism
- Theology: Worship of heavenly bodies
- Region: Harran and Upper Mesopotamia; later Baghdad
- Language: Syriac, Aramaic, Arabic
- Headquarters: Harran
- Merged into: Possibly Yazidism
- Defunct: Late 11th century
- Other names: Sabians of Harran, Harranian Sabians

The Harranians, also known as the Sabians of Harran and Harranian Sabians, were adherents of a polytheistic astral religion native to the city of Harran in Upper Mesopotamia. This religion survived through the Assyrian, Achaemenid, Hellenistic, and Roman periods, long after Christianity had spread through the surrounding region, and Harran became notorious among Christian writers for its persistent paganism. After the Muslim conquest of the city in 639, its pagans lacked a recognized scripture and so could not claim the protected legal dhimmi status granted to Jews and Christians. According to a later account in Ibn al-Nadim's Fihrist, the community resolved this during the reign of the caliph al-Ma'mun by adopting the name of the Qur'anically sanctioned Sabians and naming Hermes Trismegistus as their prophet.

Harranian doctrine held that a single transcendent power had delegated the governance of the world to the seven planets, who were worshipped through dedicated temples and rites. Their central cult was that of the moon god Sin. This core belief was overlaid with elements of Neoplatonic philosophy, Hermetic literature, and mathematical astrology. By the ninth and tenth centuries, a community of Harranian origin had become established at the Abbasid court in Baghdad, still identifying as Sabian, and retained their Sabian identity for several generations despite pressure to convert. Members of this community made lasting contributions to mathematics, astronomy, and medicine. Among its prominent members was Thabit ibn Qurra, who produced influential translations and commentaries on Greek scientific works and founded the community's leadership in Baghdad, as well as al-Battani, whose astronomical observations were later cited by Copernicus, and Sinan ibn Thabit who served as court physician to three successive caliphs.

At Harran itself, the religion's public institutions declined sharply in the eleventh century, and its last temple was destroyed by 1081. By 1184, the traveler Ibn Jubayr found no trace of the community or its cult. The city was later destroyed by the Mongol Empire in 1259–1260, but this event came after Harranian Sabianism had already disappeared as an organized religion. Some scholars, notably Artur Rodziewicz, argue that a remnant of the tradition survived indirectly, absorbed into Yazidism through the community around Sheikh Adi ibn Musafir at Lalish.

== Etymology and self-identification ==
According to an account attributed to the Christian writer Abu Yusuf Isa al-Qati'i and related by Ibn al-Nadim in the ninth chapter of his Fihrist, the pagans of Harran encountered the caliph al-Ma'mun (r. 813–833) while he was marching against the Byzantine Empire, wearing short gowns with long hair worn in side curls. Al-Ma'mun asked which of the "covenanters" they were: Jews, Christians, or Magians. They answered no to each. Asked whether they had a book or a prophet, they gave no answer. Al-Ma'mun declared them unbelievers and idolaters, "Adherents of the Head" (Aṣḥāb al-Ra's), a group he said had existed in the time of his father, Harun al-Rashid, and told them that as they held no covenant it was lawful to kill them. Green notes that al-Ma'mun's own questions show that the caliph himself was apparently unaware of any people called "Sabians," since they did not appear among the protected religions he named.

The Harranians offered to pay the Jizya, but al-Ma'mun refused it, saying that tax was accepted only from members of the religions named in the Quran, who possessed their own book. He gave them an ultimatum: convert to Islam, or to one of the religions named in the Quran, by the time he returned from his campaign, or be killed to the last man.

After al-Ma'mun's departure, some of the Harranians converted to Christianity and others to Islam, but a number remained as they were. A Muslim jurist resident in Harran advised this last group, for a fee, to tell al-Ma'mun on his return, "We are Sabians," since this was the name of a religion mentioned in the Quran, and that professing it would save them. Al-Ma'mun died shortly after leaving Harran, before he could enforce his ultimatum. Those who had followed the jurist's advice, as well as those who had converted to Christianity, are reported to have returned to their former customs once news of the caliph's death reached the city; even those who had adopted Islam, though now unable to recant, continued to practice their former religion in secret. The Harranians are also reported to have changed their dress and hairstyle to conform with those around them following the episode.

Green describes the episode as "in all probability, untrue, but nonetheless instructive," and treats it as a foundation narrative rather than a factual record. Her own retelling places the encounter in 830 CE, but Van Bladel observes that Abu Yusuf's account, though set in al-Ma'mun's reign, must itself date from roughly a century later, since it refers to Sinan ibn Thabit ibn Qurra, who died in 943; the commonly cited year of 830 is not given in the account itself but is an inference by the nineteenth-century orientalist Daniel Chwolsohn. J. B. Segal proposed that the name "Sabian" itself derives from Syriac rather than Arabic, arguing against the common derivation from a root meaning "to baptize" on the grounds that ritual ablution played, at most, a minor part in Harranian practice. He instead connected the name to the region around Nisibis, called Saba and itself a center of Syriac culture, suggesting that the Sabians known to Muhammad were Syriac speakers of northern Mesopotamia who believed in a single god and a Day of Judgment.

== History ==
=== Pre-Islamic paganism at Harran ===
Harran's association with the moon god Sin is attested from at least the Middle Bronze Age: the god and his temple already appear in 18th-century BCE texts from the archive at Mari. A treaty between the kings of Hatti and Mitanni in the 14th century BCE, and a later treaty between the Assyrian king Ashurnirari V and Mati'ilu of Arpad in the 8th century BCE, likewise invoke "Sin who dwells in Harran" as a divine guarantor, with the god's wrath as the penalty for breaking the oath.

The city's tutelary deity from at least the Assyrian period was Sin, whose temple, E-hul-hul ("Temple of Rejoicing"), was restored by a succession of rulers over more than a millennium. The Assyrian king Shalmaneser III restored the temple in the ninth century BCE, and Ashurbanipal, the last great king of Assyria, later renewed it after installing his own brother as high priest of Sin. The temple was destroyed in 610 BCE when a combined Babylonian and Median force besieged Harran in pursuit of the last Assyrian king, Ashur-uballit II, who had taken refuge there. Nabonidus, the last king of Babylon, rebuilt the temple in 553 BCE after reporting a dream in which Sin commanded him to do so, rededicating it to Sin as king and greatest of the gods and goddesses. His mother Adad-guppi had served as a priestess of the god.

The temple built by Nabonidus appears to have remained in use through the Achaemenid period, and was later remodeled along Greek architectural lines at some point during the Hellenistic period. Civic coinage of the third century CE depicts the sanctuary as a tetrastyle temple with a pediment, reflecting this Hellenized rebuilding rather than the original Mesopotamian structure. A related rural sanctuary of Sin, with rock-cut reliefs and inscriptions, has also been identified at nearby Sumatar, in the hill country northeast of the city.

Harran's strategic location on the frontier between Rome and its eastern neighbors made it a repeated flashpoint of conflict, and also repeatedly drew Roman attention to its cult of Sin. Harran lay near the site of the Battle of Carrhae in 53 BCE, in which the Parthians destroyed a Roman army under Crassus, and the city was again the scene of a Roman defeat in 260 CE.

The emperor Caracalla granted Harran the status of a Roman colonia in 214 and was assassinated near the city in April 217 while apparently intending to visit the temple of Sin. Hekster and Kaizer, examining the episode in detail, find that ancient sources disagree on how central the pilgrimage was to the circumstances of his death. Dio Cassius is the source often cited for this tradition. Green likewise records that Caracalla was killed while returning from a pilgrimage to the great temple of the Moon god outside Harran.

In 363, the emperor Julian sacrificed to Sin at Harran at the outset of his invasion of Sasanian Persia, in which he was killed; contemporaries widely read his death as an ill omen tied to the visit. Ammianus Marcellinus reports that Julian was visited by a foreboding dream at Harran after the sacrifice, and the fifth-century bishop Theodoret records that when the sealed temple was later opened, searchers found the body of a woman suspended by her hair, her belly cut open, apparently for a liver-divination of the campaign's outcome. Harran's pagan inhabitants were reportedly so distressed by the news of Julian's death that they stoned the messenger who brought it.

The cult of Sin at Harran continued through the Achaemenid, Seleucid, and Roman periods, with veneration of the moon god persisting among the city's population until the Muslim conquest. Christianity had reached Harran by the fourth century, but conversion of the general population was slow. At the end of the fourth century the pilgrim Egeria visited the city and recorded that, apart from a few clergy and monks, she found essentially no Christians among a population she described as entirely pagan. Harran's paganism was notorious among Christian writers of the late antique period, who repeatedly singled the city out for its stubborn adherence to the old planetary cults even as the surrounding region underwent Christianization. Van Bladel notes that the Harranian pagans withstood Christian persecution until the Muslim conquest of the seventh century, after which they negotiated a marginally legitimate status for their religion under the Arab caliphs.

=== The Abbasid golden age ===
By the second half of the ninth century, a community of Harranian origin, self-identified as Sabian, had become established at the Abbasid court in Baghdad. Its most prominent early figure was Thabit ibn Qurra (d. 901), who, after a doctrinal quarrel with his coreligionists in Harran, relocated to Baghdad under the patronage of Muhammad ibn Musa and, at the caliph's invitation, founded a school there staffed by fellow Harranians. Ibn al-Nadim separately reports that Thabit had originally worked as a money-changer in Harran before leaving for Baghdad, though Green considers this detail doubtful, arguing that the breadth of Thabit's later command of Greek science points to an extensive prior academic training rather than a background in trade.

Fluent in Arabic, Syriac, and Greek, Thabit worked as an astronomer, physician, and mathematician, producing commentaries on Aristotle, Euclid, and Ptolemy; Bar Hebraeus credits him with over 150 works in Arabic and sixteen in Syriac. According to the Fihrist, Thabit "founded the leadership of the pagans" in Baghdad and in the presence of the caliphs, after which the community attained secure status, high ranks, and eminence.

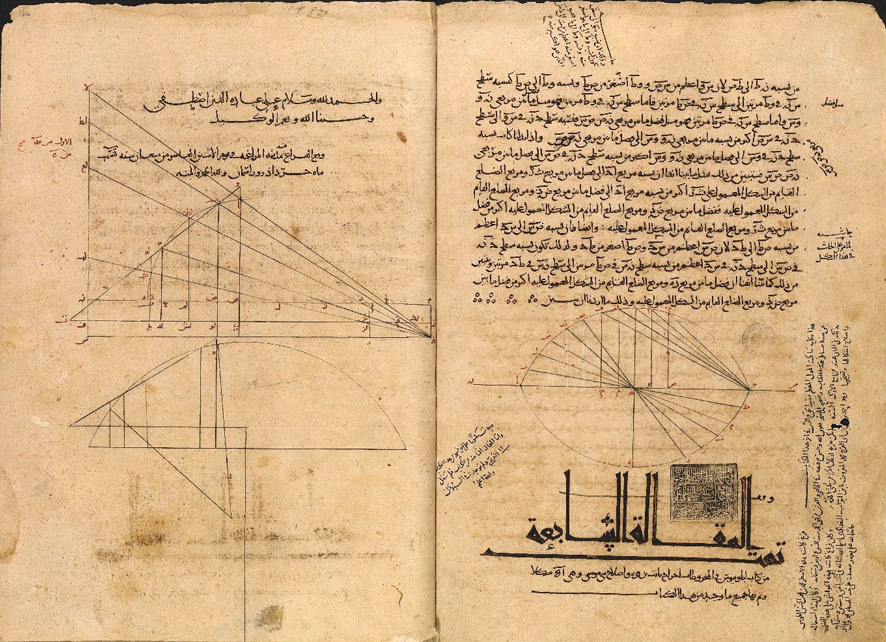
Pages from Thābit's Arabic translation of Apollonius' Conics

Other Harranians achieved prominence at court in the same period. Al-Battani (d. 929), described in the Fihrist as "a Sabian whose origin was at Harran," compiled astronomical tables based on observations of the fixed stars conducted over almost fifty years and worked, like Thabit, within the rationalist tradition of Ptolemy. Thabit's son Sinan ibn Thabit served as court physician to three successive caliphs, al-Muqtadir, al-Qahir, and ar-Radi, becoming Chief of the Physicians under al-Muqtadir. Later members of Thabit's family, including his great-grandson Ibrahim ibn Hilal al-Sabi (d. 994), served as chief secretary at the Buyid-era court in Baghdad.

=== Persecution and decline ===
The Sabians' position at court was not free of threat, despite the prestige individual members of the community achieved there. During his brief reign, the caliph al-Qahir (r. 932–934) pressured Sinan ibn Thabit to convert to Islam; Sinan initially refused, then converted under duress before fleeing to Khurasan, returning to Baghdad only after al-Qahir's deposition in 934. In 933, al-Qahir obtained a legal ruling from the jurist Abu Sa'id al-Istakhri that the Sabians should be put to death as star-worshippers distinct from Jews and Christians, but dropped the matter after receiving a large payment from the Sabian community; Van Bladel characterizes this as a "money-making scheme" rather than a sustained policy of persecution, since Sabians continued to serve successfully at court for generations afterward. Al-Istakhri's fatwa nonetheless remained in circulation among jurists for centuries. More than 150 years after al-Ma'mun's visit to Harran, Ibrahim ibn Hilal al-Sabi, offered by the vizierate if he would convert to Islam, refused, but instead persuaded the Buyid amir 'Adud al-Dawlah to issue an edict of toleration for his coreligionists in Harran, Raqqa, and Diyar Mudar, permitting the Sabians to visit their prayer-houses, temples, and assembly halls and to practice their religion in the traditional manner.

Sinan's forced conversion did little to end the family's association with Sabianism: his sons Ibrahim ibn Sinan (d. 946) and Thabit ibn Sinan (d. 976) both remained Sabian, and one of Sinan's daughters married into another Sabian family, producing Abu Ishaq Ibrahim ibn Hilal al-Sabi (925–994), a celebrated secretary and poet at the Buyid court. Roberts has argued that, far from being merely tolerated, self-identification as a Sabian could function as a distinct social and cultural asset within Baghdad's elite circles in this period, helping to explain why Thabit ibn Qurra's descendants continued to identify as Sabian for six generations despite intermittent pressure to convert.

The Baghdad line of Sabians ended with Thabit's great-great-great-grandson Hilal ibn al-Muhassin (969–1056), who converted to Islam around 1012; a near-contemporary account preserved by Ibn Khallikan states that Hilal converted late in life, on the advice of scholars concerning his religious status, out of a desire for cultural refinement (adab).

At Harran itself, the community's position deteriorated across the same period. Toleration of the pagans there appears to have been renewed in the later tenth century after an earlier decree of 933 had ordered their conversion, but the position of the cult grew steadily weaker over the following century.} The city's position deteriorated further after 1031, when local usurpers seized Harran's remaining Sabian temple, described by a contemporary source as the only temple of its kind left in the entire inhabited world, and converted it into a stronghold; many Harranian Sabians converted to Islam out of fear during the crisis. Ibn Shaddad, who visited Harran himself in 1242, separately records that the community's replacement temple, built after Iyad ibn Ghanam converted their original sanctuary into the city's Friday Mosque at the Muslim conquest, was finally destroyed by Yahya ibn al-Shatir, who was installed as governor of Harran in 1081 by the Bedouin chief Sharaf al-Dawlah. Scholars disagree on whether this represents the same 1031 destruction misdated or a second, later loss. Either way, the community's last remaining property was destroyed by the 1080s, and by 1184, when the traveler Ibn Jubayr described Harran in detail, he made no mention of Sabians at all and found no trace of their former moon cult.

=== Destruction of Harran ===
By the time of the Mongol conquest of the city, the organized Sabian religious community of Harran had, according to Van Bladel, already ceased to exist in any institutional sense for well over a century. The destruction of the city in the 1260s therefore post-dates the practical disappearance of Harranian Sabianism as a distinct, functioning religion rather than causing it, even though later popular accounts frequently conflate the two events.

Harran surrendered peacefully to the Mongol Empire under Hulagu Khan in 1259, though the city's citadel held out separately before being destroyed along with part of the city wall. Mamluk forces under Sultan Baybars subsequently drove the Mongols from the city, but the Mongols retook it in 1262, and control of Harran continued to be contested between the Mongols, the Sultanate of Rum, and the Mamluk Sultanate over the following decade. The Mongols were finally driven out in 1271 by a Bedouin force loyal to Baybars and led by 'Ala' al-din Taybars; the Harranians are reported to have asked Taybars to appoint them a governor, a request he refused. Withdrawing, the Mongols deported the population to Mardin and other towns, destroyed the Friday Mosque, and sealed the city's gates, leaving it, in the words of Ibn Shaddad, "an empty shell, but for the birds in their nests." Medieval and modern accounts otherwise disagree on the reason for the abandonment: one tradition attributes the damage to a battle with Turkish forces in the preceding year, while another holds that the Mongols themselves destroyed the city as they withdrew, and sources vary as to whether they merely sealed the gates and left the rest of the city standing or systematically stripped it of building material before burning what remained. A further factor commonly cited for the abandonment is the long-term decline of Harran's water supply, which by this period could no longer sustain a large urban population. The Encyclopaedia Iranica likewise records that Hulagu's forces deported the population and destroyed the city's public buildings, and states that despite the Mamluks' subsequent recovery of the Jazira and Harran at the start of the 14th century, the city never recovered its former importance.

The Mamluk Sultanate regained Harran from the Mongols later in the 1270s and made it the seat of a local military governor, repairing its castle (probably in the 1330s or 1340s), but made no sustained effort to revive the city itself, which had by then fallen off the major trade routes. A small settlement persisted at the site into the Ottoman period, but Harran was eventually abandoned as a permanent settlement altogether and was thereafter used mainly as a seasonal camp by local nomadic groups until it began to be resettled on a semi-permanent basis in the 1840s.

==== Aftermath and question of survival ====
The end of Harran as an urban center did not represent the first dispersal of its pagan population, since the last public vestiges of the Sabian religion had already been suppressed roughly two centuries earlier, in the later 11th century, when the surviving temple was reportedly destroyed following the Uqaylid conquest of the city in 1081. Some modern scholarship holds that the last identifiable adherents of the Harranian cult migrated eastward toward Mardin and Mosul around this time rather than at the Mongol destruction proper. The specialist on Yazidi tradition Artur Rodziewicz has argued that this migrating remnant became absorbed into the community that formed around Sheikh Adi ibn Musafir at Lalish, out of which Yazidism took its current form, and that elements of Harranian cult and cosmology can still be discerned within Yazidism today.

Within Harran itself, Segal, citing the Christian source on the al-Ma'mun episode, also describes a longer-term pattern of religious concealment among the minority who had nominally converted to Islam: unable to safely revert, they are said to have continued practicing the old religion in secret, marrying Harranian women and raising sons as Muslims while raising daughters in the older tradition.

== Religion and beliefs ==
No text written by a Harranian pagan describing the community's own beliefs in full has survived. Almost everything known about the religion comes at second hand, filtered through Muslim and Christian writers with their own polemical or classificatory biases, and later discussed by Jewish scholars such as Maimonides as well. The single most important source is Ibn al-Nadim's Fihrist (compiled 987–988), whose chapter on the Sabians draws on at least three named authors and one anonymous Syriac text; modern scholars regard it as the oldest and most reliable body of information on the subject. A separate, ninth-century summary of Sabian doctrine is attributed by the historian al-Mas'udi to a contemporary writer, Ahmad ibn al-Tayyib al-Sarakhsi.

Much of the detailed picture of Harranian ritual life circulating in modern popular accounts, including specific correspondences of colors, metals, and animal sacrifices to each planet, derives largely from the nineteenth-century Russian orientalist Daniel Chwolsohn's Die Ssabier und die Ssabismus (1856). Chwolsohn synthesized these medieval Arabic sources with later Islamic astrological and talismanic literature; his reconstruction remains foundational to the field, but Van Bladel and Pingree caution that it does not always distinguish material genuinely attributable to Harran from later or unrelated astrological traditions, and should be used critically rather than taken as a direct transcript of Harranian practice.

Harran, together with Edessa and Nisibis, served as a center for translating Greek texts into Syriac, and the wider religious culture of Northern Mesopotamia in this period absorbed Mesopotamian, Syrian, Arab, Nabataean, and Parthian ritual traditions alongside Hellenistic and Semitic currents of gnosticism, Hermeticism, and Greek philosophy.

=== Astral/planetary worship ===
A ninth-century account attributed to Ahmad ibn al-Tayyib places at the core of Harranian religion a single, eternal supreme power, transcendent and beyond the reach of direct human worship, who delegated the administration of the universe to the seven planets. The planets in turn proclaimed the supreme god's sovereignty and served as intermediaries between him and humanity. Ibn al-Nadim's calendar of Harranian festivals describes offerings made to "the seven deities" alongside the traditional planetary gods Sin, Shamash, and others, though the calendar names the seven planets as a group only twice. Green suggests this low frequency may reflect a general popular belief in astrology rather than a clearly defined planetary religion.

The Harranians maintained temples associated with different planetary deities within and around the city. Later astrological and talismanic compilations offer the fullest surviving descriptions of individual temples' architecture, dedicated colors, and ritual practices, but these are less reliable than the earliest testimony, and likely reflect literary elaboration of the cult as much as eyewitness record. Later Islamic-period polemicists accused the Harranians of animal and even human sacrifice to the planetary deities. Such accusations are difficult to verify independently and were a common trope in heresiographical writing about rival religions generally.

Later Muslim sources also describe the Sabians observing fixed daily prayers and orienting themselves toward a particular direction during worship. Van Bladel argues this reflects the Harranians' own deliberate adaptation, presenting their practice in terms Muslim observers would recognize as comparable to Islamic prayer. Muslim writers had no evident motive to invent such a resemblance, while Harranians had clear incentive to claim one, making deliberate borrowing by the Harranians the more likely explanation.

The earliest surviving Arabic description of Harranian religion comes from Theodore Abu Qurra, Chalcedonian bishop of Harran in the early ninth century, writing before the community had adopted the name "Sabian." He reports that the Harranian pagans worshipped the seven planets, the sun, the moon, Saturn, Mars, Jupiter, Mercury, and Venus, together with the twelve signs of the zodiac, regarding them as the creators and governors of the world who dispensed good and bad fortune, and that they named Hermes the Sage as their prophet in this matter. Later Arabic sources, writing after the community's adoption of the Sabian name, consistently describe their religion in similar astral terms.

The tenth-century historian al-Mas'udi records a set of temples corresponding to the planets and other intellectual substances, each in a distinct geometric form: round for the soul, hexagonal for Saturn, triangular for Jupiter, rectangular for Mars, square for the Sun, a triangle within a quadrangle for Venus, a triangle within an elongated quadrangle for Mercury, and octagonal for the Moon. Ibn al-Nadim, drawing on al-Sarakhsi's testimony, similarly describes the planets as mediators appointed by the Creator to govern the sub-celestial world, to whom the Sabians made offerings.

A more elaborate cosmology is attributed to the Sabian Harranians by the tenth-century philosophical circle known as the Ikhwan al-Safa (Brethren of Purity): a universe of nine concentric spheres in which the planets, governed in turn by higher spiritual beings, direct the affairs of the terrestrial world and the individual dispositions of humans and animals. They credit the Sabians with 87 temples dedicated to the planets in their various zodiacal exaltations. The account's agreement with al-Sarakhsi's philosophical description in the Fihrist may reflect a shared Isma'ili interpretive framework projected onto Harranian doctrine, rather than an independent confirmation of it.

==== Notable deities ====
The main deities are:

- The Moon, Sin
- The Sun, Shamash
- Jupiter, Merodach (patron god)
- Venus, Ishtar (love)
- Saturn, Ninip (agriculture)
- Mercury, Nebo (literacy)
- Mars, Nergal (death)

=== Hermes Trismegistus as prophet-figure ===
Among the prophets recognized by the Harranian Sabians, Hermes Trismegistus held a central place. One key source is an Arabic account naming the community's "luminaries" as Seth, Agathodaemon, and Hermes, described in sequence as the first, second, and third "Urani," later identified respectively with the biblical Seth and with the Quranic prophet Idris, himself identified with the biblical Enoch. Van Bladel treats this identification of Hermes as a prophet as the one element of the later, more elaborate Arabic Hermes tradition that can be attributed with reasonable confidence to the Harranians themselves. Recognition as a protected religious community under Islamic law required both a revealed book and a named prophet, so casting Hermes in this role, alongside the adoption of the Quranic name "Sabians," gave the Harranians a basis for claiming toleration comparable to that granted to Jews and Christians.

The best-known elaboration of the Hermes legend in Arabic literature describes three successive Hermeses: an antediluvian Hermes, identified with Idris, who foresaw the biblical Flood and built the pyramids of Egypt to preserve knowledge from destruction; a second Hermes who taught in Babylon after the Flood and instructed Pythagoras; and a third, active in Egypt, who taught alchemy and medicine to students including Asclepius. In the earliest surviving version of this legend, the antediluvian Hermes is linked to the Persian king-figure Wiwanghan and made the grandson of Gayumart, identified with Adam. Fearing that knowledge would be lost in the Flood, he is said to have carved the arts and sciences into a mountain at Akhmim in Upper Egypt, in addition to building the pyramids. The ninth-century astrologer Abu Ma'shar al-Balkhi constructed this schema by combining earlier Greek chronographical traditions with an Iranian legend, in his lost work The Thousands. David Pingree argued that the Babylonian Hermes in particular showed Harranian influence, but Van Bladel rejects this: he considers that Pingree overstated the Harranians' importance in ninth-century intellectual life, and argues that the Babylonian element instead reflects a separate Iranian tradition claiming Hermes as its own.

Van Bladel is also skeptical of a popular thesis, proposed by Michel Tardieu and defended by Ilsetraut Hadot, that philosophers from the Athenian Academy relocated to Harran after Justinian closed the Academy in 529 CE and there preserved a continuous school of genuine late-antique Neoplatonic teaching. He calls the evidence for this controversial at best, and finds specific supporting arguments, such as etymological speculation about names in Simplicius's works, far-fetched. Other scholars, including Jan Lameer, Robin Lane Fox, Dimitri Gutas, and Charles Genequand, have likewise found the case unconvincing.

The clearest instance of a genuinely Harranian Hermetic composition, in Van Bladel's assessment, is a late text called the Testament to Ammon, in which Hermes lays down a religious code for his followers closely modeled on Islamic law: theft is punished by cutting off the hand, highway robbery by beheading and crucifixion of the body as a public warning, adultery by fifty lashes for the man and stoning with a hundred stones for the woman, and same-sex relations by burning, alongside a command to wage holy war against unbelievers. Van Bladel argues it was most plausibly written by a Harranian Sabian in Baghdad, seeking to present Hermes, and Sabian religion generally, in terms a Muslim audience would accept as legitimate: the author must have written after Islamic law was well established but before al-Mubashshir compiled his anthology in 1048/49, shows detailed familiarity with Greek, Middle Persian, and Sanskrit wisdom literature in translation, and never mentions Abu Ma'shar's already-famous three-Hermes legend, suggesting a deliberate rival account making Hermes one prophet rather than three.

Adherence to Hermetic dietary taboos is recorded among individual Baghdad Sabians as late as the tenth century. According to Yaqut's biographical dictionary, Ibrahim ibn Hilal, a Sabian who died in 994, was offered 1,000 dinars to eat fava beans, and refused because they were forbidden to him.

=== The Nabataean Agriculture ===
A work titled Kitab al-Filaha al-Nabatiya ("The Nabataean Agriculture"), despite its title, is concerned less with farming than with the hidden properties of natural things, presenting a mixture of Hermetic magic, prophecy, and divination framed as a translation from "the language of the Chaldaeans." It is attributed to a certain Ibn Wahshiyya, but Green considers it more likely the work of the ninth-century Shi'ite writer Abu Talib Ahmad ibn al-Zayyat, who claimed the text had been dictated to him by Ibn Wahshiyya. The work later appears in the Ghayat al-Hakim immediately after an account of Sabian planetary invocations and incense recipes, where the extract drawn from it focuses on a Nabataean prayer to Saturn and on the magical power of the planets.

Its value as a source for pre-Islamic Mesopotamian or Harranian religion has been assessed very differently by different scholars. Chwolsohn took its claimed ancient pedigree at face value, while Theodor Nöldeke argued the entire work was a tenth-century forgery. Others, including Fuat Sezgin, have since argued for at least partial authenticity, and some scholars have suggested the text preserves genuinely older material, possibly dating to the sixth century CE. Martin Plessner specifically attempted to rehabilitate the text by tracing its possible genuine underlying sources. Ibn al-Nadim's Fihrist separately lists its purported author among practitioners of alchemy, credited with knowledge of preparing the substance used in divination.

Green treats the work's usefulness as a source specifically for the Harranians as doubtful, since its descriptions of planetary cult and idol worship are generic rather than tied clearly to Harran. Among its material is a claim, attributed to one of its purported Aramaic sources, that Hermes, and before him Agathodaemon, had forbidden fish and fava beans to their people, though it adds that Egyptians continued to grow fava beans for medicinal use despite the prohibition. Van Bladel notes that Jaakko Hämeen-Anttila's more recent study of the text, together with other evidence, points to the genuine persistence of polytheistic practice of various kinds in Sasanian-era Mesopotamia. He is broadly skeptical of claims, common in earlier scholarship, that ascribe Hermetic material to Harranian influence without adequate evidence tying it to Harran specifically.

=== Temple architecture ===
The clearest architectural description of any Harranian temple comes from Nabonidus's own sixth-century BCE inscriptions describing his rebuilding of E-hul-hul, the temple of Sin. The structure was roofed with cedar brought from Lebanon, its friezes were inlaid with lapis lazuli, and its doors were plated with silver, reflecting the wealth a Neo-Babylonian king was prepared to invest in the sanctuary. This building replaced an earlier temple on the same site that had stood, with periodic royal restoration, since at least the Neo-Assyrian period, and that had been destroyed in 610 BCE during the fall of Assyria.

The temple rebuilt by Nabonidus appears to have remained in cultic use through the Achaemenid period, but was substantially remodeled along Greek architectural lines at some point in the Hellenistic era. Civic coinage of Harran from the third century CE depicts the sanctuary of Sin as a tetrastyle temple with a pediment, a distinctly Greco-Roman form rather than the Mesopotamian original, indicating that the building visible to a Roman-period visitor bore little physical resemblance to Nabonidus's temple even if cultic continuity was maintained. A separate rural sanctuary associated with the cult of Sin, featuring rock-cut reliefs and inscriptions rather than a freestanding temple building, has been identified at nearby Sumatar.

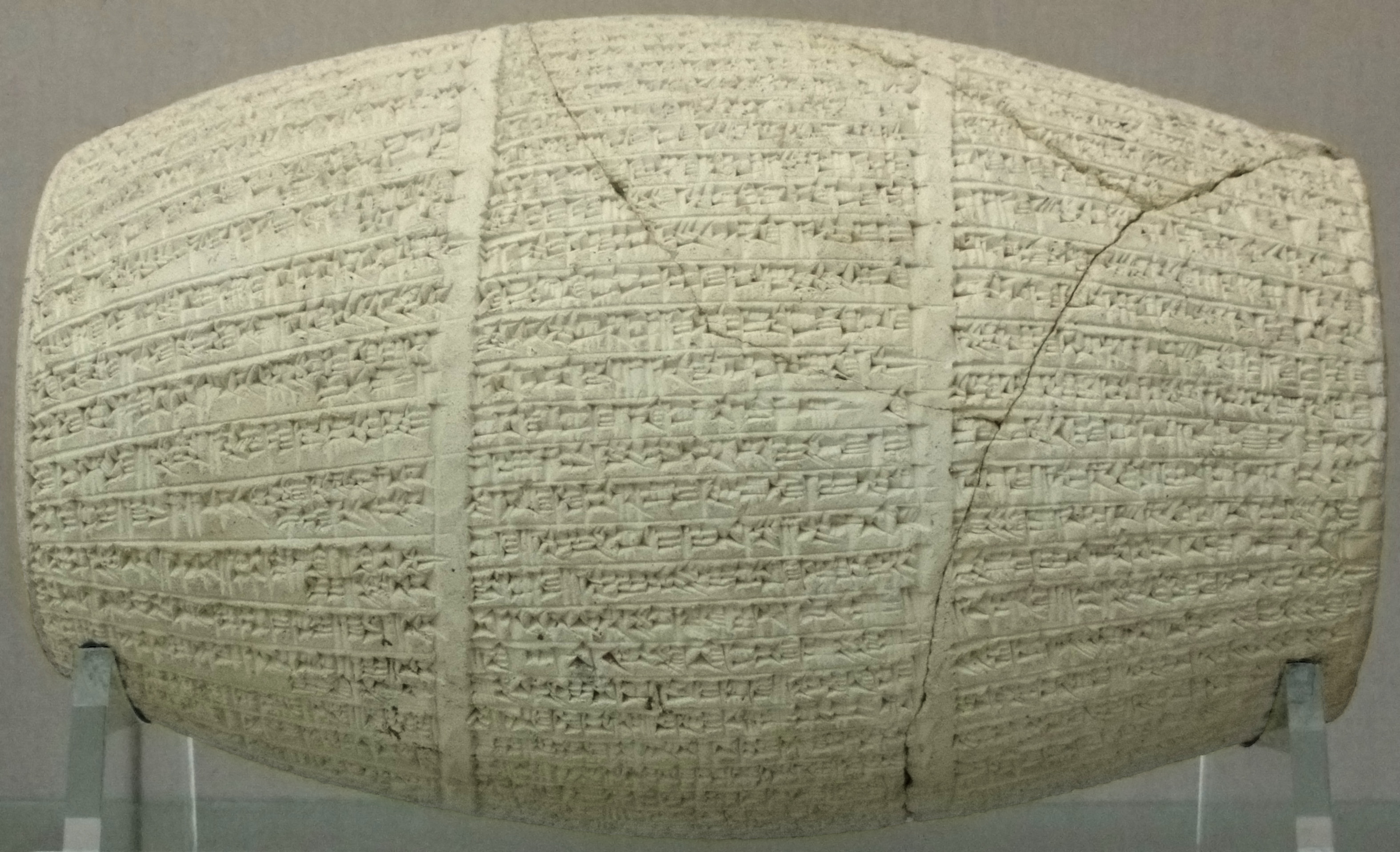
Clay foundation cylinder of Nabonidus; Nabonidus was a king with a particular interest in ancient traditions; this document records the pious reconstruction of temples to the Moon god at Harran and to the sun god and the goddess Anunitum at Sippar; during the work at Sippar, inscriptions of the older kings Naram Sin and Shagarakti Shuriash were discovered, and Nabonidus offers dates for them considerably exaggerating their age.

The exact location and appearance of the temple, or its successor, in the final pre-Islamic and early Islamic centuries remains a matter of scholarly uncertainty, since no continuously standing structure survives. Evidence connecting the temple specifically to the Great Mosque site emerged in 1956, when the excavator D. S. Rice discovered three inscribed Neo-Babylonian stelae of Nabonidus reused as paving stones in the mosque's eastern entrance and steps, published in detail by C. J. Gadd in 1958. The find demonstrates that material from Nabonidus's temple, or a closely associated structure, was physically present at or near the mosque site by the time of its construction. It does not by itself prove that the mosque stands on the temple's exact footprint, since inscribed stelae could in principle have been moved as spolia from elsewhere in the city, and specialists continue to treat the precise location of the pre-Islamic temple building as an open question pending further excavation. Green independently concludes that the Great Mosque was most likely built on the site of Sin's original temple.

According to Ibn Shaddad, the Harranians' temple was converted into a mosque by Iyad ibn Ghanam at the time of the Muslim conquest in 639, prompting the community to build a replacement temple elsewhere in the city. The replacement temple, described by the contemporary Christian historian Yahya of Antioch as the only one of its kind "left to their ecumene," survived until it was seized during a political crisis in 1031, converted into a citadel by the Numayrid amir Mani ibn Shabib in 1059/60, and finally destroyed in 1081. A separate account by the geographer al-Dimashqi attributes the temple's destruction to a Fatimid raid in 1032. Green considers this unreliable, noting that there is little corroborating evidence for a Fatimid role and that Dimashqi contradicts himself elsewhere in the same chapter. Van Bladel reaches a more qualified verdict on the same passage: he judges Dimashqi's account derivative of Yahya of Antioch's and confused in general, but considers he may nonetheless be correct that the temple confiscated in 1032 was the fortified structure the Harranians called al-Mudawwar ("the round one"), a name Dimashqi identifies directly with the city's fort. If so, this would support identifying the temple with the citadel site rather than the Great Mosque.

Descriptions of the temples' interior forms during the Sabian period survive only in later literary accounts. Al-Mas'udi records a set of temples corresponding to the planets, each in a distinct geometric form: round for the soul, hexagonal for Saturn, triangular for Jupiter, and so on through the remaining planets. No physical remains matching these descriptions have been identified at Harran itself. The nearby site of Sumatar Harabesi, some 60 kilometres to the southeast, preserves substantial epigraphic and archaeological evidence of a moon-god cult, including Syriac dedicatory inscriptions and reliefs dated to the second and third centuries CE. This material considerably predates the Islamic-period Sabian community and belongs to a physically distinct, though related, local cult site.

=== Calendar ===
Two independent calendars purporting to record the festivals of the Harranian Sabians survive from the Islamic period, and they differ from each other substantially. The first, preserved in Ibn al-Nadim's Fihrist, was compiled by Abu Sa'id Wahb ibn Ibrahim, whom Ibn al-Nadim identifies as a Christian. Almost nothing else is known about him: Hjarpe suggests a ninth- or tenth-century date, and Bayard Dodge, Ibn al-Nadim's translator, tentatively identified him with a secretary to the vizier of the caliph al-Muqtadir, though this identification is otherwise unsupported. His account shows the same polemical hostility toward paganism found in earlier Christian writers on Harran. The second is preserved in Biruni's Chronology of Ancient Nations, copied, according to Biruni, from an otherwise obscure work by Muhammad ibn Abd al-Aziz al-Hashimi. Both calendars contain local Harranian place names, including the shrine of Dayr Kadhi, confirming they describe the city specifically rather than a generic pagan tradition.

The two sources disagree on when the year began. Hashimi's calendar, as reported by Biruni, opens with Tishri (September–October), coinciding with the autumn equinox, though Biruni separately notes a tradition placing the new year at the winter solstice, on the first day of Kanun II. Wahb ibn Ibrahim's calendar instead opens with Nisan (April), the traditional Mesopotamian start of the civil year, while also marking a major festival on the last day of Kanun I, coinciding with the winter solstice. Michel Tardieu has suggested these discrepancies reflect the coexistence of several distinct calendrical traditions among Harran's different ethnic communities. Tardieu, who argues that Simplicius composed his commentary on Aristotle's Physics at Harran, points to a passage in that commentary noting differing New Year conventions among the Greeks, "Asians," Romans, and Arabs.

The two calendars also differ further on the deities, festivals, and dates recorded for individual months. For Nisan, the Fihrist records a feast to Baltha (Venus) on 1–3 Nisan, a sacrifice to the Moon and to "the seven deities, the devils, jinn, and spirits" on 6 Nisan, a mystery rite called "the mystery of the North" on 15 Nisan, and pilgrimages with animal sacrifice to Dayr Kadhi on 20 Nisan and to Sabta on 28 Nisan, the latter dedicated to Hermes. Hashimi's calendar for the same month instead lists a series of largely unrelated observances, including feasts for figures named Damis and Ploutos and the breaking of a great fast. Wahb ibn Ibrahim's calendar records that in the month of Tammuz (July), Harranian women wept for a god named "Ta'uz," a mourning rite Green notes was celebrated widely across Mesopotamia. Hashimi's calendar, as reported by Biruni, places what appears to be the same festival a month earlier, on 7 Haziran (June), a discrepancy Green attributes to possible scribal error in one or both texts.

=== Prophets ===
Among those counted as prophets by the Harranians, aside from Hermes Trismegistus, include "Budhasaf", whom Biruni says arrived in the first year of Tahmuras, who Biruni says some call Hermes that the Harranian's religion was founded by this figure, who was from India, beyond this, Biruni also claims that Haran, the brother of Abraham is the founder of the Harranian religion. Aside from this, Biruni records that the following men were the prophets of the Harranians: Aghādhīmūn, Wālīs, Pythagoras, Bābā, a third century local prophet, Sawar, the grandfather of Plato.

== Society and culture ==
Harran lay at the intersection of several ancient caravan routes linking Asia Minor, Syria, and Mesopotamia, and its position on the trade route between the Mediterranean and the plains of the middle Tigris made it a wealthy mercantile city from at least the early second millennium BCE. The prophet Ezekiel numbered Harran among the cities trading in fine garments and luxury textiles. Successive waves of Assyrian, Babylonian, Achaemenid, Seleucid, Parthian, and Roman rule left the city's population and religious culture layered rather than uniform, with indigenous Mesopotamian, Aramaic, and Arab strands identified among its inhabitants by late antiquity.

=== Language ===
Following the Parthian conquest of the region in 94 BCE, Aramaic served as the lingua franca of Mesopotamia even as the Parthian rulers themselves adopted Greek as their official language. Harran lay within a predominantly Syriac-speaking milieu in northern Mesopotamia, alongside Edessa and Nisibis, and, together with those two cities, was known as a center for the translation of Greek texts into Syriac in late antiquity. Syriac continued to serve as an intermediary language for the transmission of Greek learning into Arabic well into the Islamic period. Green cites the ninth-century physician Hunayn ibn Ishaq, personal physician to the caliph al-Mutawakkil, who reported that he and his son used Syriac as the intermediate language in their translations of Greek medical texts.

The Baghdad Sabians associated with Thabit ibn Qurra worked with several languages. Thabit himself was fluent in Arabic, Syriac, and Greek, and Bar Hebraeus credits him with more than 150 works in Arabic alongside sixteen in Syriac.

=== Social organization ===
Al-Mas'udi, who visited Harran in person in 943 CE, described the Harranian community as divided between an educated minority and the general population: the common people practiced sacrifice, divination, and ritual observance, while a separate class among them pursued philosophy, a distinction he attributed in part to Greek influence on Harranian thought. Harran had also long been an important market for metals and minerals. Green suggests this trade may have supported guilds of metalworkers whose rituals drew on correspondences between celestial bodies and terrestrial metals, and connects this to the development of an indigenous Syriac alchemical literature at Harran before the Islamic period.

Among the philosophically educated minority, the clearest evidence of formal communal leadership comes from Baghdad rather than Harran itself. Thabit ibn Qurra is described in the Fihrist as having founded the ri'asa, the leadership or headship, of the pagans in Baghdad, exercised in the presence of the caliphs. Ibn al-Nadim reports that Thabit had originally worked as a money-changer in Harran before leaving for Baghdad, but Green considers this biographical detail suspect, since the breadth of Thabit's knowledge of Greek science points to an extensive familiarity with the academic tradition rather than a background in trade. Van Bladel describes Thabit as "the father and chief of the Harranian Sabians of Baghdad," a role combining religious with communal authority: he wrote a series of works in Syriac for his own community, on burial, Sabian doctrine, ritual purity, allegorical language, appropriate and inappropriate sacrificial animals, the proper times of worship, and the correct performance of prayer, none of which survives. Two thirteenth-century sources, one Arabic (Ibn al-Qifti) and one Syriac (Bar Hebraeus), mention a work titled The Laws of Hermes and the Prayers the Sabians Use, both attributing it to a Baghdad Sabian but disagreeing on which one. Van Bladel argues Bar Hebraeus's attribution to Thabit is probably a documented error, arising from his conflation of two separate work-lists, both ultimately compiled by Sinan's great-grandson al-Muhassin (d. 1010); the more reliable account credits Sinan with translating the work into Arabic from a Syriac original, though the identity of the original author remains uncertain.

=== Relations with other religious communities ===
Harran's relationship with Christianity was long-standing and often adversarial. Christianity is thought to have reached the city via nearby Edessa as early as the first century CE, though no bishop of Harran is attested with certainty before the fourth century; the first securely known bishop, Barses, was transferred to the more senior see of Edessa in 360/361 on the order of the emperor Constantius II, and the fourth-century poet Ephrem the Syrian referred to the church at Harran as "the daughter of Barses," implying he had been its founding or first bishop. Despite the existence of an organized Christian community and bishopric, the pagan cult of Sin remained dominant among the city's population for centuries afterward, and Segal, discussing the al-Ma'mun encounter narrative, cautions that its Christian narrator wrote against the background of a long history of bitter conflict between Harran's pagans and its Christian community.

Harran's pagans faced sustained hostility from the Christian communities of the surrounding region well before the Muslim conquest. Writing in the fourth century, the theologian Theodoret described Harran as "a barren spot full of the thorns of paganism and needing abundant labor." The Theodosian decree of 391 CE, which closed pagan temples and banned sacrifice, libation, and divination empire-wide, was only partially enforced in the region, and the city's continued paganism became a recurring target for Syriac Christian writers. Rabbula, bishop of Edessa (d. 435–436), ordered the closure of four pagan shrines in the region, and both Isaac of Antioch (d. before 461) and Jacob of Sarug (d. 521) devoted homilies to condemning the persistence of the old cults. Writing of the Bedouin conquest of Beth Hur, a town near Amida said to have been founded by settlers from Harran, Isaac of Antioch likened it to a shoot grown from the vine of perdition, a new Harran risen in their land, attributing its fall to the pagan practices it had inherited. Green notes that in the writings of contemporary theologians, Harran and neighboring Edessa came to represent opposing symbols in the religious landscape of the region: Harran as the city of the pagans, Edessa as a city with its own claimed apostolic Christian foundation.

Christian communities nonetheless coexisted with Harran's pagans within the city itself. Theodore Abu Qurra, a Chalcedonian Christian, served as bishop of Harran in the early ninth century and left the earliest surviving Arabic description of the city's planetary cult. A Christian writer, Abu Yusuf Isa al-Qati'i, is likewise credited as the source of the account of the pagans' encounter with al-Ma'mun and their adoption of the name "Sabians."

Relations with the Muslim state that governed Harran after 639 were defined largely through the legal category of dhimmi status, which the pagans initially lacked and only secured by claiming the Quranic name of Sabians. Even after this, the community's position periodically came under pressure, as when the caliph al-Qahir obtained a legal ruling (fatwa) in 933 permitting the Sabians to be put to death as star-worshippers distinct from Jews and Christians, a measure that was dropped after payment, although the fatwa remained in circulation among jurists for generations.

== Legacy ==
=== Transmission of Greek science ===
The Harranian scholars active at the Abbasid court played a documented role in transmitting Greek scientific and philosophical works into Arabic. Thabit ibn Qurra produced translations and commentaries on Aristotle, Euclid, and Ptolemy. His reputation as a scientist persisted in medieval Europe: the thirteenth-century English scholar Roger Bacon called him "the supreme philosopher among all Christians, who has added in many respects... to the works of Ptolemy," despite mistakenly describing Thabit as a Christian.

Al-Battani, described in the Fihrist as a Sabian of Harranian origin, compiled astronomical tables based on nearly fifty years of his own observations of the fixed stars, following, like Thabit, the rationalist astronomical approach of Ptolemy. Al-Battani's tables reached Latin Europe through a translation made by Plato of Tivoli in 1116, which was later annotated by the astronomer Regiomontanus. Nicolaus Copernicus cited al-Battani, under the Latinized name "Albategnius," repeatedly in De revolutionibus orbium coelestium, the work that inaugurated the Copernican model of the solar system.

=== Transmission of Hermetic and esoteric literature ===
The Ikhwan al-Safa, a tenth-century philosophical circle, incorporated a version of Sabian planetary cosmology into their own encyclopedic writings, describing nine concentric spheres governed by planets in turn directed by higher spiritual beings, and crediting the Sabians with a total of 87 temples built according to zodiacal position. This account may reflect an Isma'ili philosophical framework projected onto Harranian doctrine as much as an independent report of it, meaning the influence likely ran in both directions.

The principal surviving vehicle for Harranian-linked astrological and magical material is the Ghayat al-Hakim ("The Aim of the Wise"/"The Goal of the Sage"), an Arabic compendium of celestial magic compiled in al-Andalus around the mid-tenth to mid-eleventh century. It is traditionally, though probably wrongly, attributed to Maslama al-Majriti, and drew extensively on Sabian planetary theology and ritual alongside Hermetic, Neoplatonic, and Hellenistic astrological material. The work was translated into Castilian Spanish at the court of Alfonso X of Castile between 1256 and 1258, and from Castilian into Latin shortly afterward, circulating in Latin manuscript under the title Picatrix. Despite its Hermetic and Harranian content, the work was not composed as a religious text for the Harranian community itself, and should not be read as a Sabian scripture.

==== Legendary status in Western esotericism ====
Renaissance humanists read the Sabian material embedded in the Picatrix through the lens of prisca theologia, the belief that a single, pure theology had been revealed to the earliest sages of humanity, Hermes Trismegistus, Zoroaster, and Orpheus, and passed down, in corrupted form, through successive schools of philosophy. Marsilio Ficino and Pico della Mirandola accordingly treated the Harranian planetary material in the Picatrix as a surviving fragment of this primordial revelation, worth recovering and reconciling with Platonic and Christian doctrine. Ficino drew on the work for the theory of planetary talismans and astrological medicine set out in his De vita libri tres (1489), a foundational text of Renaissance astrological medicine; Cornelius Agrippa drew on the same material for De Occulta Philosophia a generation later. Eugenio Garin judged the Latin Picatrix as indispensable to understanding Renaissance magic as the Corpus Hermeticum itself.

In the twentieth century, the American astrologer Marc Edmund Jones invoked the name directly. In 1923 he founded a study group in Los Angeles called the Sabian Assembly, and in 1925, working with the medium Elsie Wheeler, produced the Sabian Symbols, a set of 360 intuited images corresponding to each degree of the zodiac, published in 1953 as The Sabian Symbols in Astrology.

=== Substratum in Yazidism ===
Since the nineteenth century, several observers of Yazidi religion have noted resemblances to the Sabian religion of Harran. This did not go unnoticed among early Yazidology's pioneering figures: the archaeologist Austen Henry Layard, having catalogued several similarities between the two groups, concluded that the Yazidis "have more in common with the Sabeans than with any other sect." Research on Yazidism was subsequently dominated for decades by a paradigm favoring Zoroastrian and Mithraic origins, and this line of inquiry was largely abandoned; where attention has since returned to the Harran connection, it has tended to come from specialists in adjacent fields. In 2004 Şinasi Gündüz argued that the Harranians matter for Yazidi history because, following the Mongol destruction of Harran in the thirteenth century, the city's remaining pagan and Muslim population was deported and forced to settle around Mardin and Mosul, where the followers of Adawiyya already lived.

==== Peacock motif, Mercury connection, and calendar ====
Astrological texts drawing on Harranian Sabian tradition depict Mercury, identified with Hermes, as a scribe riding a peacock and holding a serpent. The Picatrix (Ghayat al-Hakim, 10th–11th century) describes him as "a crowned man riding a peacock, holding a rod... and a book," and Biruni, writing in 1029, similarly describes Mercury as "a youth seated on a peacock, in his right hand a serpent and in the left a tablet." The same peacock-and-serpent image appears in an illustration of Mercury in a manuscript of Qazwini's Wonders of Creation (the "London Qazvini"). The art historian Stefano Carboni argues this manuscript was likely produced in the region stretching from Mosul through Tur Abdin toward Mardin, Diyarbakir, and Van, precisely the area associated with both the remaining Sabians and the Yazidis, and proposed that Yazidi belief, centered on the Peacock Angel Tawûsî Melek, was influenced by the Harranian Sabians in this period. Rodziewicz endorses the core of this argument, though he notes that Carboni does not fully explain Mercury's specific significance to the Yazidis. Rodziewicz's own conclusion is that the combined cult of the peacock and the serpent most probably originated in the Harranian cult of Hermes and Agathodaemon, later spreading both into mainstream Islamic astronomical illustration and, independently, into Yazidi symbolism.

This connection is reinforced by the Yazidi calendar itself. Wednesday is the Yazidis' holiest day of the week, observed with prayer and ritual restrictions and marking the date of their principal New Year festival. Across a wide range of unrelated languages, Wednesday is specifically the day of Hermes or his counterparts: the Latin dies Mercurii calques the Greek "day of Hermes," surviving in French mercredi and Italian mercoledì; the English "Wednesday" derives from Woden, the Germanic god considered Hermes's counterpart; and in Hindu tradition the day is named for Budha, who is likewise equated with Mercury. Both traditions also share the month in which they mark the New Year. Ibn al-Nadim reports that the Harranian Sabians began their year in Nisan (April), and that in the middle of the month they held a festival for "Shamal," described as chief of the jinn and their greatest divinity, marked by sun worship, sacrificial slaughter, burnt offerings, and feasting. The Yazidis likewise celebrate their New Year in Nisan, centered on the sanctuaries of the Lalish valley, whose characteristic conical domes were already described by the nineteenth-century traveler William Francis Ainsworth as appearing to be "a Sabean relic."

==== The Heptad ====
Both traditions also organize their cosmology around a set of seven governing powers. The Hermetic and Harranian tradition's "Seven Rulers," associated with the seven planets, has a counterpart in the Yazidi cult of the Seven Mysteries, whose cosmogony likewise describes God creating seven "Reasons" on the seven days of the week, each paired with a planet. Moses Maimonides described the Sabians as regarding the sun as their chief deity and all seven planets as gods. Rodziewicz notes that this description could equally serve as an account of the Yazidi veneration of the sun, still expressed today in the annual Festival of the Assembly, when a bull is sacrificed before the Sheikh Shams shrine at Lalish. At the same time, he cautions that veneration of a group of seven planetary powers was not unique to the Harranians and Yazidis: comparable systems appear in Assyrian and Babylonian religion generally, in the Pythagorean and Platonist tradition, in Gnostic accounts of seven Archons, and among the fourth-century Daisanite followers of Bardaisan of Edessa. Shared reverence for "the Seven" cannot therefore by itself establish a direct historical connection between Harran and Lalish.

==== Abraham ====
A further point of comparison concerns the figure of Abraham, claimed by both traditions in connection with Harran. The tenth-century geographer Ibn Hawqal reported that the Sabians maintained a shrine at Harran, "on a lofty heap, which they ascribe to Abraham," which they held in high veneration and to which they made pilgrimage. The Quranic commentator al-Kisa'i records a legend in which Abraham comes to Harran to convert the Sabians, who possessed writings handed down from Seth and Idris. Some accept his faith, while others refuse, saying, "How can we believe you, since you read no Book?", and remain in the area professing "the religion of Seth, Idris and Noah." Yazidi oral tradition similarly holds that Birahim Xelil ("Ibrahim the Friend") was born and dwelt at Harran, along with nearby Edessa and the village of Ain al-Arus, before moving to Egypt and the Hijaz; the tradition describes him first worshipping the sun, moon, and stars before recognizing the God behind them.

==== Umayyad connection ====
Sheikh Adi is said to have descended from the Umayyad line through Abu Sufyan, and the dynasty's ties to Upper Mesopotamia ran deep: Marwan II, Adi's own ancestor, made Harran his imperial capital, and a 13th-century Syriac chronicle from Edessa records that the people of Harran fought alongside Mu'awiya against Ali and, on that basis, "honoured Yazid, the son of Mu'awiya." At the time, Harran remained a stronghold of the pre-Islamic Harranian religion. Theophilus, a Christian of Edessa, reported that Marwan II was a pagan who "belonged to the heresy of the Epicureans, that is, Automatists, an impiety he had imbued from the pagans who dwell at Harran." Sultan Ezid is one of the three principal manifestations of God in Yazidism, alongside Tawûsî Melek and Sheikh Adi ibn Musafir; Yazidi tradition identifies his earthly incarnation with Yazid ibn Mu'awiya, the second Umayyad caliph (r. 680–683). Rodziewicz reads the Harranite chronicle as a possible trace of a specifically religious veneration of Yazid ibn Mu'awiya already current among the pagan Harranian Sabians, situating the roots of his cult in this milieu rather than treating it as a purely later Yazidi innovation.

Some Yazidi, Christian, and Muslim sources trace a direct genealogical connection between Harran and Sheikh Adi ibn Musafir. An anonymous nineteenth-century manuscript, The History of the Yezidis in Mosul and Environs, records that Adi "came and dwelt in Mount Lalish, near the city of Mosul... Some say he was of the people of Harran, and related to Marwan ibn al-Hakam." Rodziewicz notes that the reading is not entirely secure, since some manuscript copies give "people of Hawran," a different region, instead of "people of Harran." He nonetheless considers the Harran reading plausible rather than a simple error.

==== Appearance ====
Nineteenth-century travelers also connected the two groups by external appearance. E. S. Drower observed that the long hair, tall felt hats, and white garments among Yazidis of Sinjar recalled descriptions of the ancient Harranians, and Ottoman administrators referred to the Yazidi-inhabited Sinjar mountains as "Saçlı Dağ," the "Mountain of the Long-Haired People."

==== Veneration of Seth ====
The prophet Seth, identified in the Sabian tradition with Agathodaemon, is also venerated at Mosul itself. A mausoleum dedicated to Seth stood in the city until its destruction by the Islamic State in 2014, its conical dome built, like other religious structures in Mosul, in a style shared with Yazidi shrine architecture.

== Notable Sabians ==
- Thabit ibn Qurra (826–901): mathematician, astronomer, and physician; relocated from Harran to Baghdad and founded the leadership of the Sabian community there.
- Al-Battani (c. 858–929): astronomer of Harranian origin whose observational tables were translated into Latin in the twelfth century and cited by Copernicus.
- Sinan ibn Thabit (d. 943): physician, son of Thabit ibn Qurra; served as court physician to three successive caliphs and briefly converted to Islam under duress during the persecution of al-Qahir.
- Ibrahim ibn Hilal al-Sabi (925–994): great-grandson of Thabit ibn Qurra; served as chief secretary at the Buyid court in Baghdad and is recorded as having maintained inherited Sabian dietary taboos.
- Abu Ishaq Ibrahim ibn Hilal al-Sabi (925–994): secretary and poet at the Buyid court, great-grandson of Thabit ibn Qurra; repeatedly declined pressure to convert, including a reported offer of the vizierate, and wrote a Buyid historical chronicle, al-Kitab al-Taji.
- Hilal ibn al-Muhassin al-Sabi (969–1056): historian and last prominent member of the Baghdad Sabian line, converting to Islam around 1012.

== Sources ==
- Attrell, Dan; Porreca, David (2019). Picatrix: A Medieval Treatise on Astral Magic. University Park, PA: Pennsylvania State University Press. ISBN 978-0-271-08213-4.
- Barsoum, Ignatius Aphram (2009) [1943]. The Scattered Pearls: A History of Syriac Literature and Sciences. Translated by Moosa, Matti (2nd rev. ed.). Piscataway, NJ: Gorgias Press. ISBN 1-931956-04-9.
- Blömer, Michael (2023). "Sîn City: Notes on the Moon God of Ḫarrān/Carrhae in the Partho-Roman Period". Electrum. 30: 307–338. doi:10.4467/20800909EL.23.011.17328.
- Chwolsohn, Daniel (1856). Die Ssabier und die Ssabismus. St. Petersburg: Buchdruckerei der Kaiserlichen Akademie der Wissenschaften.
- Gadd, C. J. (1958). "The Harran Inscriptions of Nabonidus". Anatolian Studies. 8: 35–92. doi:10.2307/3642558.
- Green, Tamara M. (1992). The City of the Moon God: Religious Traditions of Harran. Leiden: E. J. Brill. ISBN 9004095136.
- Hekster, Olivier; Kaizer, Ted (2012). "An Accidental Tourist? Caracalla's Fatal Trip to the Temple of the Moon at Carrhae/Harran". Ancient Society. 42: 89–107.
- Hutton, Ronald (2003). "Paganism in the Missing Countries". Witches, Druids and King Arthur. London: Hambledon and London. ISBN 1852853972.
- Jones, Marc Edmund (1953). The Sabian Symbols in Astrology. New York: Sabian Publishing Society.
- Lloyd, Seton; Brice, William; Gadd, C. J. (1951). "Harran". Anatolian Studies. 1: 77–111. doi:10.2307/3642358.
- Pingree, David (2002). "The Sābians of Ḥarrān and the Classical Tradition". International Journal of the Classical Tradition. 9 (1): 8–35. doi:10.1007/BF02901729.
- Rice, D. S. (1952). "Medieval Ḥarrān: Studies on Its Topography and Monuments, I". Anatolian Studies. 2: 36–84. doi:10.2307/3642423.
- Roberts, Alexandre M. (2017). "Being a Sabian at Court in Tenth-Century Baghdad". Journal of the American Oriental Society. 137 (2): 253–277. doi:10.7817/jameroriesoci.137.2.0253.
- Rodziewicz, Artur (2022). Eros and the Pearl: The Yezidi Cosmogonic Myth at the Crossroads of Mystical Traditions. Berlin: Peter Lang. doi:10.3726/b19936. ISBN 978-3-631-88043-2.
- Rosenthal, F. "Hilāl b. al-Muḥassin b. Ibrāhīm al-Ṣābiʾ". Encyclopaedia of Islam. Vol. III (2nd ed.). Leiden: Brill. p. 385.
- Segal, J. B. (1963). "The Sabian Mysteries". In Bacon, Edward (ed.). Vanished Civilizations. New York: Alfred A. Knopf. pp. 201–220.
- Sinclair, T. A. (1990). Eastern Turkey: An Architectural and Archaeological Survey, Volume IV. London: Pindar Press. ISBN 0907132340.
- Tardieu, Michel (1986). "Ṣābiens coraniques et "ṣābiens" de Ḥarrān". Journal Asiatique. 274: 1–44.
- Van Bladel, Kevin (2009). The Arabic Hermes: From Pagan Sage to Prophet of Science. Oxford Studies in Late Antiquity. Oxford: Oxford University Press. ISBN 9780195376135.
