= Eudaemon (mythology) =

Good spirit in Greek mythology

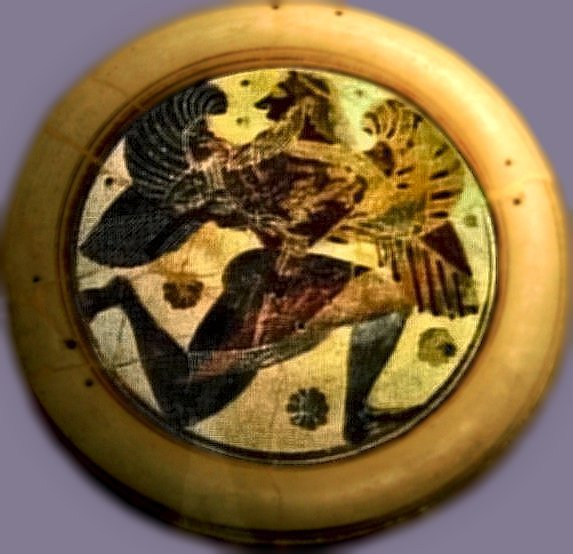
Winged daemon depicted in ancient Corinthian plate.

The eudaemon, eudaimon, or eudemon (Ancient Greek: εὐδαίμων) in Greek mythology was a type of daemon or genius (deity), which in turn was a kind of spirit. A eudaemon was regarded as a good spirit or angel, and the evil cacodaemon was its opposing spirit.

== Etymology ==
The word eudaimon in Greek means having a good attendant spirit, and consequently being happy. It is composed of the words εὖ eu, which means "well" or "good" and δαίμων daimon, which means "divinity, spirit, divine power, fate, or god." Sometimes eudaimon is taken to mean literally "good spirit". Also daimon is the Greek derivative for the term demon, in which case "demon" means "replete with knowledge".

Moreover, Eudaimon is as well an ancient proper noun, in particular it was the Greek name of a priest of Zeus and father of P. Aelius Aristeides, a notorious rhetorician of the second century AD.

== Characteristics ==
Eudaemons in Greek mythology included deified heroes. They were regarded intermediary spirits between gods and the men. Eudaemons, the good daemons, were understood as guardian spirits, bestowing protection and guidance to ones they watched over.

As a counselor, the eudaemon whispered advice and opinions in one's ear. Such person escorted by the eudaemon was considered fortunate. It was said that Socrates during his lifetime had a daemon that always warned him of threats and bad judgment, but never directed his actions. According to Socrates, his daemon was more accurate than the respected forms of divination at that time, such as either reading the entrails or watching the flights of birds.

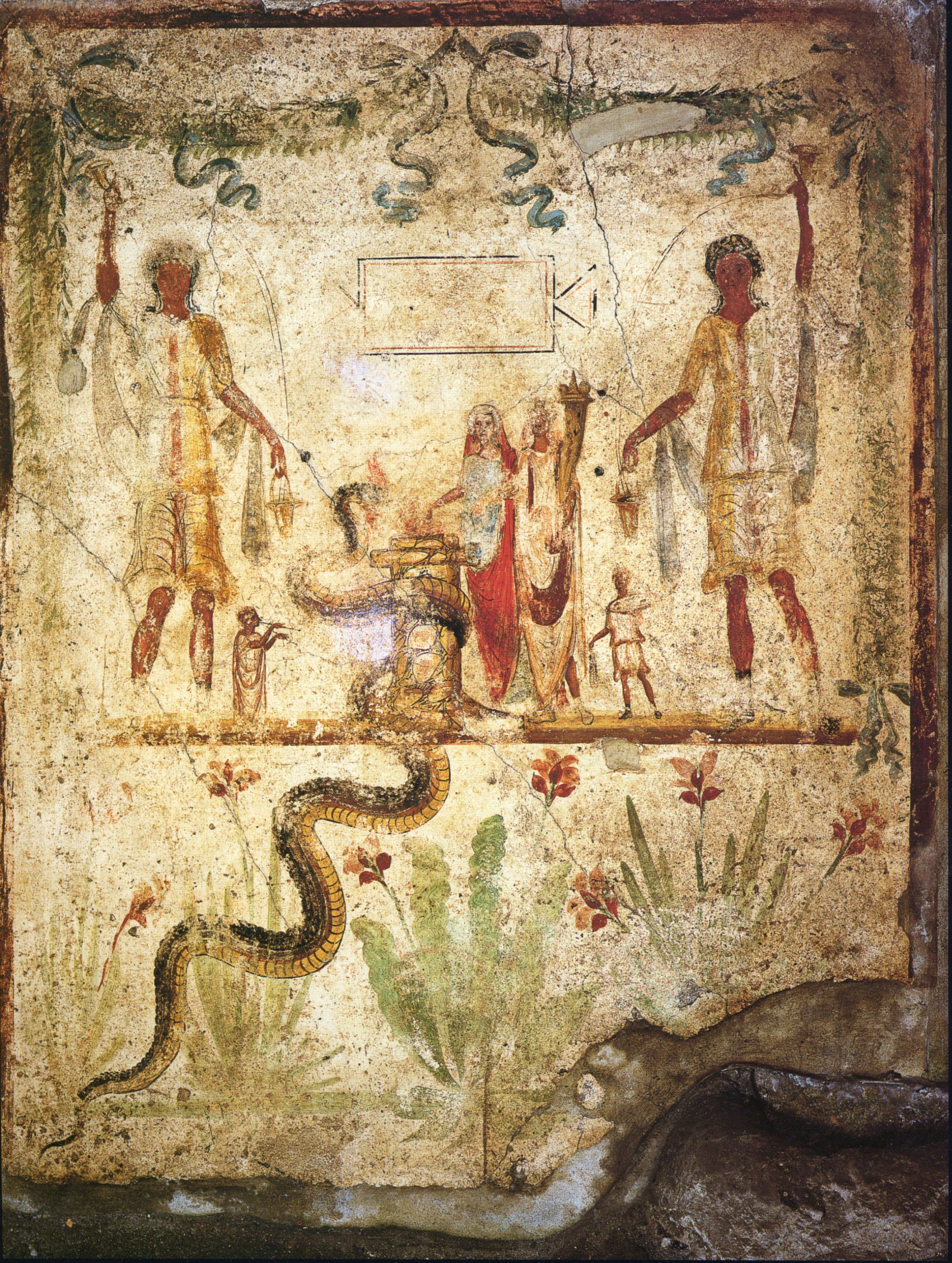
Fresco from shrine at a house in Pompeii showing an offering to Agathos, a benevolent daemon, which appears in form of serpent about the altar in a garden, 1st century A.D.

A worshiped good daemon was Agathodaemon in whose honor the first libation to the god Dionysus was dedicated.

=== Other definitions ===
The philosopher Aristotle believed that a happy person is one who is eudaemon, but still in a literal manner one possessing a good or fortunate daemon. Heraclitus believed that a person’s character is his guardian daemon.

Once in a while the good daemon may also stand for the souls of the deceased. For example, the heroine Alcestis in 438 BCE Athenian tragedy by the Greek Euripides, is reported as a "blessed daemon" subsequent to her death.

According to psychologist Carl Jung there is not eudaemon or else cacodaemon but only the daemon, which is a unique independent spirit neither good nor bad, living in everyone.

In mystical approaches eudaemon is sometimes defined as a symbol of "higher self", or the individual in the "causal body." As well it is a symbol of intelligence on the "buddhic plane" and higher esoteric planes, which assists evolution and is related to the higher thoughts and emotions.

== See also ==
- Eudaemons
- Eudaimonia
- Eidolons
- Cacodemon
- Lares Familiares
- Penates
- Shoulder angel
- Tutelary deity
- List of angels in theology
