= Sinan ibn Thabit =

Sabian physician, astronomer and mathematician

Abū Saʿīd Sinān ibn Thābit ibn Qurra (Arabic: أبو سعيد سنان بن ثابت بن قرة), c. 880–943, was a medieval scholar who served as the court physician of the Abbasid caliphs al-Muqtadir (r. 908–934), al-Qahir (r. 932–934), and al-Radi (r. 934–940).

As the son of Thabit ibn Qurra (c. 830–901) and the father of Ibrahim ibn Sinan (908–946), Sinan belonged to an illustrious family of astronomers and mathematicians who hailed from the Upper-Mesopotamian city of Harran and who worked at the Abbasid court in Baghdad. He and his family belonged to a religious sect of star worshippers known as the Sabians of Harran, though Sinan was forced to convert to Islam during al-Qahir's brief reign (932–934), in which the Abbasid caliph persecuted the Sabians and eventually forced Sinan to flee to Khurasan for a short period. It appears that his children remained Sabian: his sons Ibrahim ibn Sinan and Thabit ibn Sinan (died 976) both remained Sabian, while one his daughters married into another Sabian family, giving birth to Ibrahim ibn Hilal al-Sabi' (925–994), who also resisted multiple attempts to convert him from his ancestral faith.

Although Sinan ibn Thabit was primarily known as a physician, having built several hospitals in Baghdad and having overseen a licensing system for physicians, he apparently did not write anything on medicine. His works, which dealt with political philosophy, mathematics, and astronomy, are all lost except for a short treatise on moral philosophy called Siyāsat al-nufūs ("On Governing Souls"). His work on political philosophy, which was inspired by Plato's Republic, was criticized by the historian al-Mas'udi (died 956).

== See also ==
- Category:Sabian scholars from the Abbasid Caliphate
