= Ptolemy's world map =

2nd century Greco-Roman map of the world

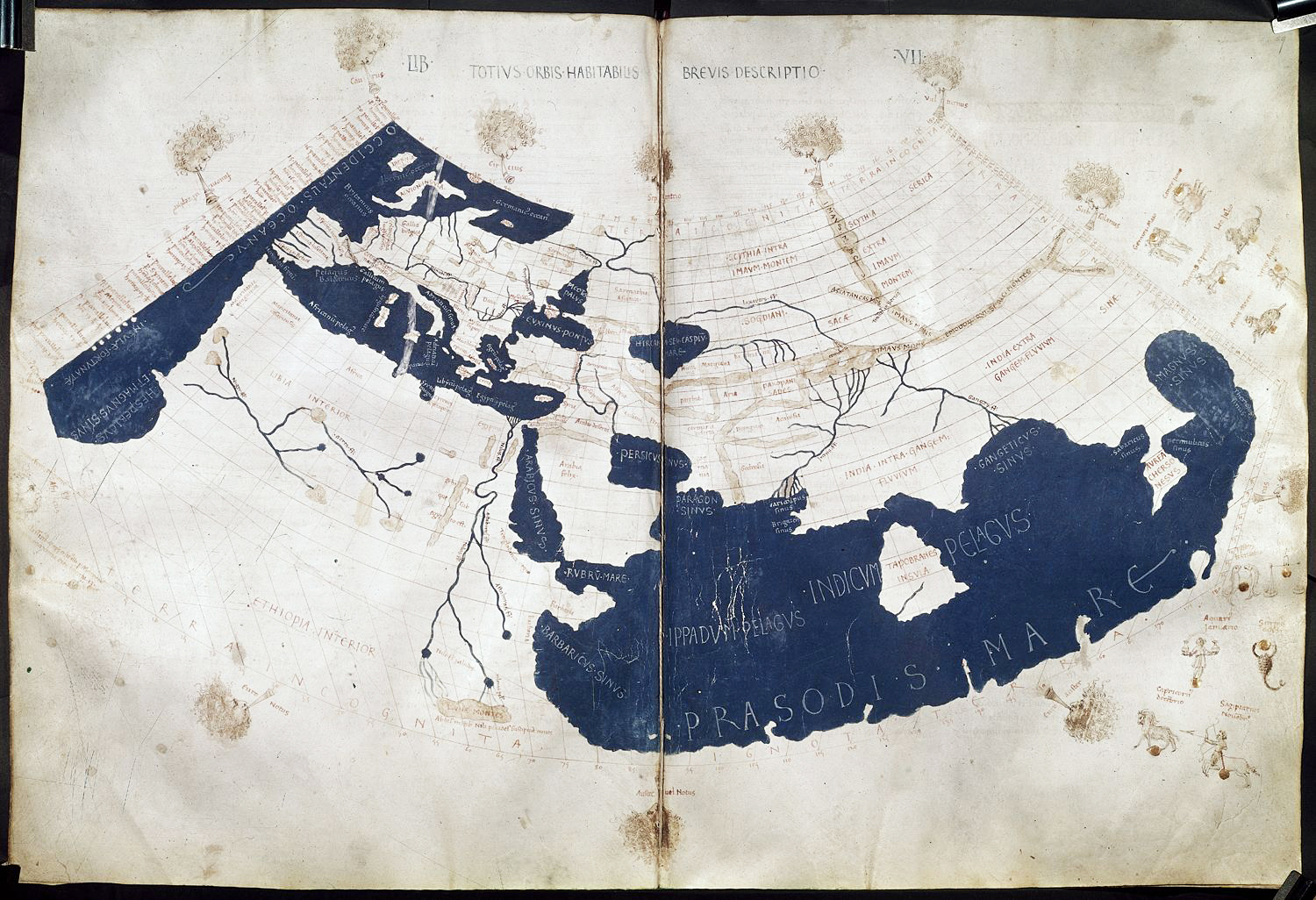
Ptolemy's world map, reconstituted from Ptolemy's Geography (c. 150) in the 15th century, indicating "Sinae" (China) at the extreme right, beyond the island of "Taprobane" (Ceylon or Sri Lanka, oversized) and the "Aurea Chersonesus" (Southeast Asian peninsula)

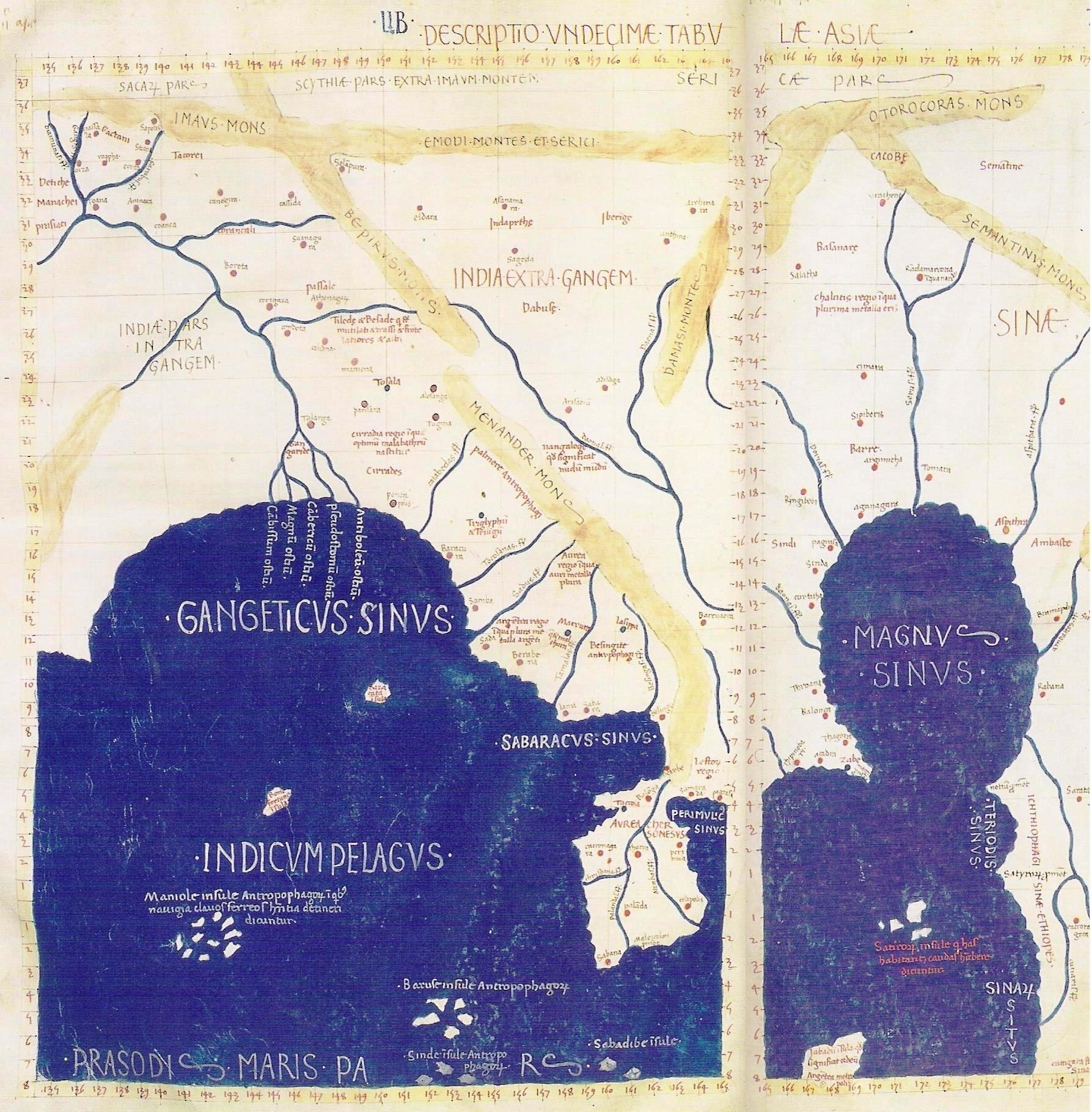
Detail of East and Southeast Asia in Ptolemy's world map. Gulf of the Ganges (Bay of Bengal) left, Southeast Asian peninsula in the center, South China Sea right, with "Sinae" (China)

The Ptolemy world map is a map of the world known to Greco-Roman societies in the 2nd century. It is based on the description contained in Ptolemy's book Geography, written c. 150. Based on an inscription in several of the earliest surviving manuscripts, it is traditionally credited to Agathodaemon of Alexandria.

Notable features of Ptolemy's map are the first use of longitudinal and latitudinal lines as well as specifying terrestrial locations by celestial observations. The Geography was translated from Greek into Arabic in the 9th century and played a role in the work of al-Khwārizmī before lapsing into obscurity. The idea of a global coordinate system revolutionized European geographical thought, however, and inspired more mathematical treatment of cartography.

Ptolemy's work probably originally came with maps, but none have been discovered. Instead, the present form of the map was reconstructed from Ptolemy's coordinates by Byzantine monks under the direction of Maximus Planudes shortly after 1295. It probably was not that of the original text, as it uses the less favored of the two alternate projections offered by Ptolemy.

== Continents ==
The continents are given as Europe, Asia, and Libya (Africa). The World Ocean is only seen to the west. The map distinguishes two large enclosed seas: the Mediterranean and the Indian (Indicum Pelagus). Due to Marinus and Ptolemy's mistaken measure of the circumference of the earth, the former is made to extend much too far in terms of degrees of arc; due to their reliance on Hipparchus, they mistakenly enclose the latter with an eastern and southern shore of unknown lands, which prevents the map from identifying the western coast of the World Ocean.

India is bound by the Indus and Ganges rivers, but its peninsula is much shortened. Instead, Sri Lanka (Taprobane) is greatly enlarged. The Malay Peninsula is given as the Golden Chersonese instead of the earlier "Golden Island", which derived from Indian accounts of the mines on Sumatra. Beyond the Golden Chersonese, the Great Gulf (Magnus Sinus) forms a combination of the Gulf of Thailand and South China Sea which is bound by the unknown lands thought to enclose the Indian Sea. China is divided into two realms—the Qin (Sinae) and the Land of Silk (Serica)—owing to the different accounts received from the overland and maritime Silk Roads.

The Geography and the map derived from it probably played an important role in the expansion of the Roman Empire to the East. Trade throughout the Indian Ocean was extensive from the 2nd century, and many Roman trading ports have been identified in India. From these ports, Roman embassies to China are recorded in Chinese historical sources from around 166.

The Danish historian Gudmund Schütte attempted to reconstruct the Danish part of Ptolemy's world map. It includes several place- and tribe-names, some of which Schütte assigned a contemporary equivalent. The most prominent feature of the map is the peninsula Jutland placed north of the river Albis Trêva, west of the Saxonôn Nesôi (archipelago), east of the Skandiai Nêsoi, which itself lies west of a larger island Skandia. Skandia is home to the Goutai in the center, and the Phiraisoi in the east.

North of Jutland lies a third archipelago Alokiai Nêsoi. South of the Albis live the Lakkobardoi and to its north the Saxones. The west coast of Jutland is home to the Sigulônes, the Sabaliggio, the Kobandoi, the Eundusioi and the northernmost Kimbroi (possibly Cimbri). North and east is home to the Kimbrikê (possibly Cimbri), the Chersonêsos and the Charudes.
