= Agathodaemon (alchemist) =

Egyptian alchemist

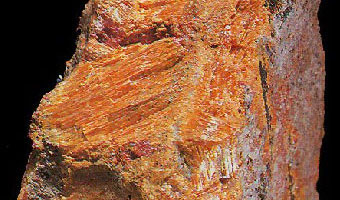
Agathodaemon created his 'fiery poison' by fusing a mineral (probably realgar (seen here) or orpiment) with natron.

Agathodaemon (Ancient Greek: Ἀγαθοδαίμων, Agathodaímōn; c. 300) was an alchemist in late Roman Egypt, known only from fragments quoted in medieval alchemical treatises, chiefly the Anepigraphos, which refer to works of his believed to be from the 3rd century. He is primarily remembered for his various descriptions of elements and minerals, most particularly his descriptions of a method of producing silver, and of a substance he had created, which he called a 'fiery poison', and which, judging by his account, was arsenic trioxide, a highly toxic amphoteric oxide.

He described the 'fiery poison' as being formed when a certain mineral (most probably realgar or orpiment) was fused with natron (naturally occurring sodium carbonate), and that dissolved in water to give a clear solution. He also wrote of how, when he placed a fragment of copper into the solution, the copper turned a deep green hue, lending further validity to the suggestion that orpiment or realgar was used, as they are both arsenic ores, and this would be the hue achieved from the copper after it had been placed in the arsenic trioxide had the substance formed been copper arsenite.

Agathodaemon's discoveries exist as part of the foundations for the later use of poison, as arsenic and related substances were used regularly in later centuries as a means of poisoning and murder. Since the only records of his existence are references in later works, he may be apocryphal, but since the practice of alchemy itself began to decline around the time he is believed to have lived, it may be that much of his writing was lost. This information that was gathered by the Nestorians eventually passed on to the Arabs, and this in part contributed to the flourishing of alchemy in that region and in their hands; the modern English word "alchemy" comes from the Arabic language, and many of the foundations for alchemy in Western nations were laid by the Arabs.

== See also ==
- Other Agathodaemons
- Zosimos of Panopolis, a roughly contemporary Egyptian alchemist who mentioned creating a homunculus named "agathodaemon"
- Set (deity), the Egyptian god later confounded with the Greek agathodaemon and probably also the alchemist, invoked in Islamic alchemy
