= Ibrahim ibn Sinan =

Arab mathematician and astronomer

- Born: c. 908; Baghdad, Abbasid Caliphate, now Iraq
- Died: 946
- Occupations: Astronomer, mathematician
- Era: Islamic Golden Age
- Father: Sinan ibn Thabit

Ibrahim ibn Sinan (Arabic: Ibrāhīm ibn Sinān ibn Thābit ibn Qurra, ابراهيم بن سنان بن ثابت بن قرة; born 295 – 296 AH/c. 908 in Baghdad, died: 334-335 AH/946 in Baghdad, aged 38) was a mathematician and astronomer who belonged to a family of scholars originally from Harran in northern Mesopotamia. He was the son of Sinan ibn Thabit (c. 880 – 943) and the grandson of Thābit ibn Qurra (c. 830 – 901). Like his grandfather, he belonged to a religious sect of star worshippers known as the Sabians of Harran.

Ibrahim ibn Sinan studied geometry, in particular tangents to circles. He made advances in the quadrature of the parabola and the theory of integration, generalizing the work of Archimedes, which was unavailable at the time. Ibrahim ibn Sinan is often considered to be one of the most important mathematicians of his time.

== Sources ==
- Roberts, Alexandre M. (2017). "Being a Sabian at Court in Tenth-Century Baghdad". Journal of the American Oriental Society. 137 (2): 253–277. doi:10.17613/M6GB8Z.
- Van Brummelen, Glen (2007). "Ibrāhīm ibn Sinān ibn Thābit ibn Qurra". In Hockey, Thomas; et al. (eds.). The Biographical Encyclopedia of Astronomers. New York: Springer. p. 574. doi:10.1007/978-0-387-30400-7_697. ISBN 978-0-387-31022-0. (PDF version)
