= Shoulder angel =

Plot device used for an effect in fictional works

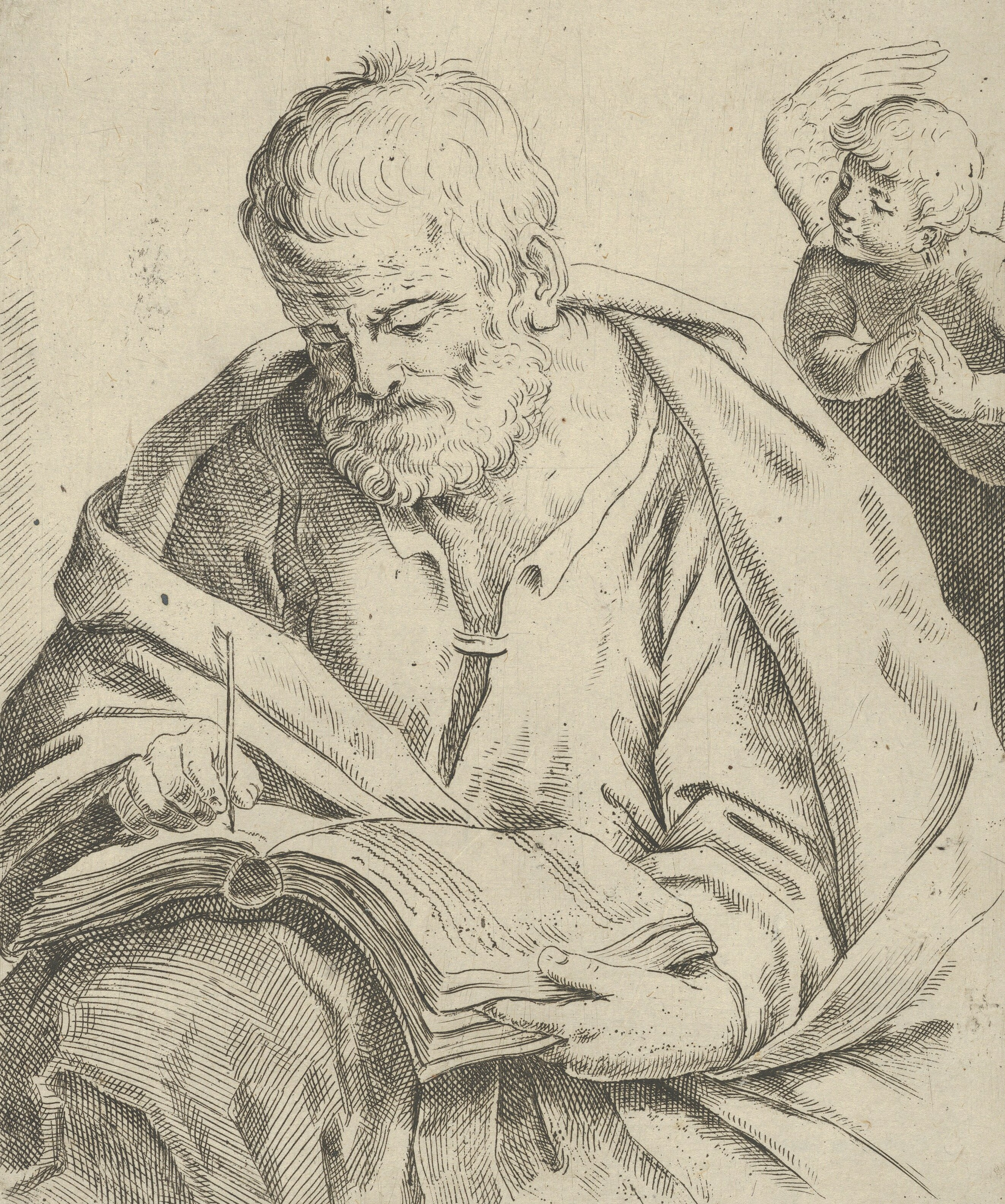
After Guido Reni

A shoulder angel is a plot device used for dramatic and/or humorous effect in fiction, mainly in animation and comic books/strips. The angel represents conscience and is often accompanied by a shoulder devil representing temptation. They are a useful convention for depicting the inner conflict of a character.

== Iconography ==
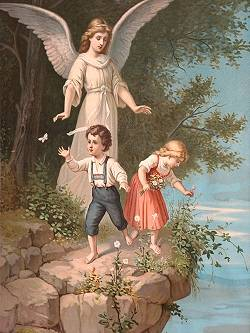
A guardian angel in a 19th-century print

The shoulder angel often uses the iconography of a traditional angel, with wings, a robe, a halo, and sometimes a harp. The shoulder devil likewise usually looks like a traditional devil, with reddish skin, horns, barbed tail, a trident, and in some cases, cloven hooves. Often, both resemble their host, though sometimes they will resemble other characters in the story who are responsible or mischievous. In Western culture, the idea develops the Christian concept of a personal guardian angel, who was sometimes considered to be matched by a personal devil who countered the angel's efforts, especially in popular medieval dramas like the 15th century The Castle of Perseverance. In both this and Christopher Marlowe's play The Tragical History of Doctor Faustus, of about 1592, the "Good Angel" and "Bad Angel" offer competing advice (Act 2, scene 1, etc.) to the hero.

== Origins ==
=== Early Christianity ===
The non-canonical early Christian book The Shepherd of Hermas, of around A.D. 140–150, has a reference to the idea of two angels: "There are two angels with a man—one of righteousness, and the other of iniquity". These angels in turn descend into a person's heart, and attempt to guide a person's emotions. Hermas is told to understand both angels, but to only trust the Angel of Righteousness. The concept is similar to ideas of personal tutelary spirits that are very common in many ancient and traditional cultures.

=== Christian folklore ===
In some Christian folklore, each person has a dedicated guardian angel whose task is to follow the person and try to prevent them from coming to harm, both physical and moral. At the same time each person is assailed by devils, not usually considered as single and dedicated to a single person in the same way as the guardian angel, who try to tempt the person into sin. Both angels and devils are often regarded as having the ability to access the person's thoughts, and introduce ideas.

=== Ancient Judaism ===
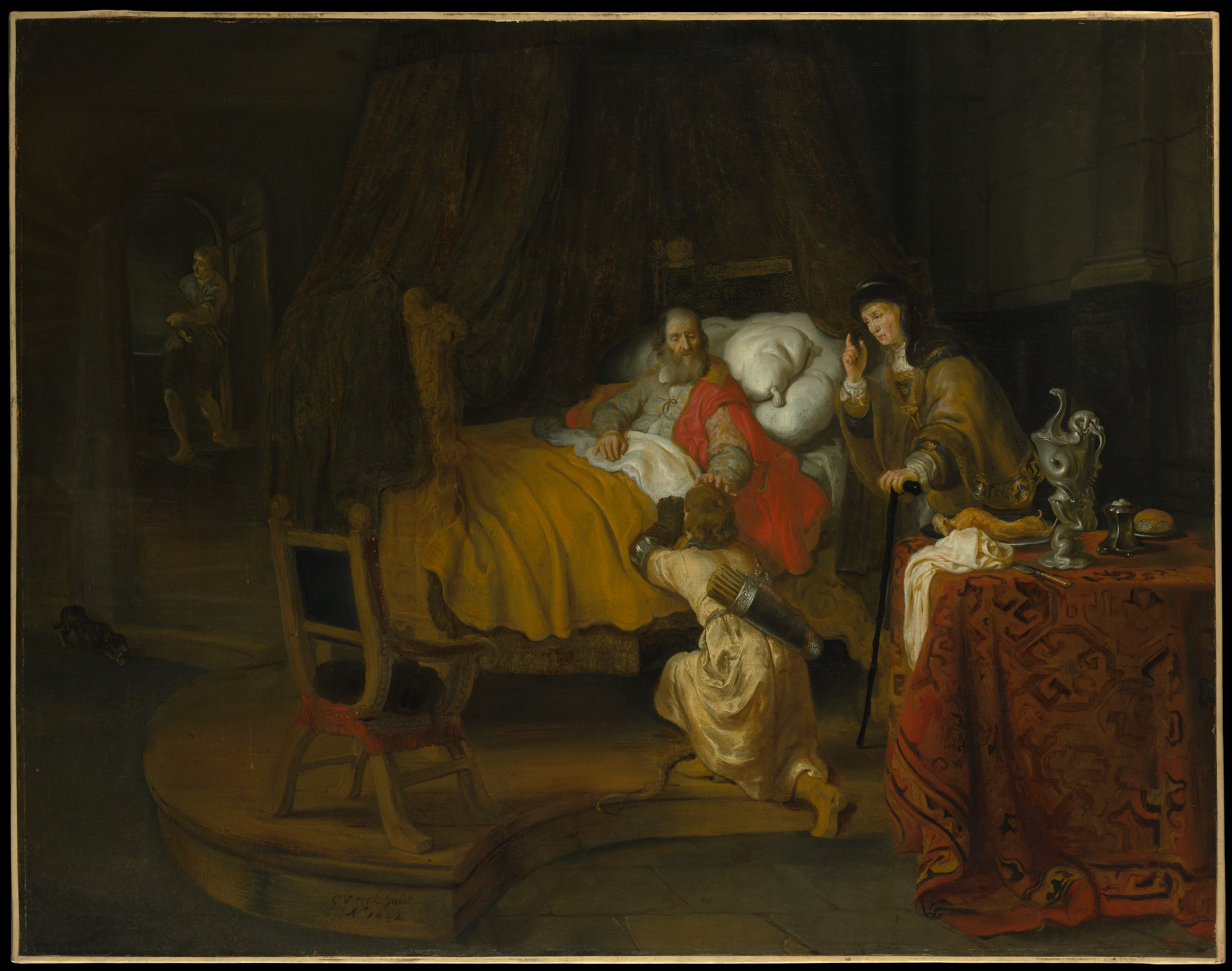
"When [Isaac] told Jacob, “Come closer that I may feel you, my son,” (Gen 27 21) he urinated onto his calves, and his heart became as soft as wax, and God assigned to him two angels, one on his right and one on his left, in order to hold him up by his elbows." Genesis Rabbah 65:19

In the ancient midrash, Genesis Rabbah, the concept appears in connection with Isaac's deathbed blessing for Jacob (see figure and caption, right.)

== Modern representations ==
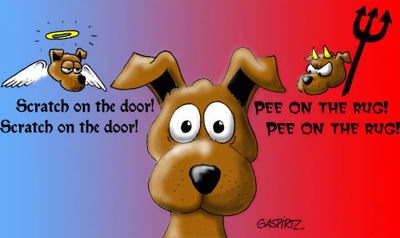
Modern cartoon

In several modern fictional stories, a character can be marked as especially evil or mischievous by receiving similarly bad advice from both shoulder figures, having a second shoulder devil instead of the angel, or being persuaded by the devil to kick the angel out.

== See also ==
- Archangel
- Cacodemon
- Eudaemon (mythology)
- Id, ego and super-ego
- Guardian angel
- List of films about angels
- Jiminy Cricket
- Psychomachia
- Qareen
- Two wolves
