= Shai =

Ancient Egyptian deity

- Modern depiction of Shai based on an image from the papyrus of Ani
Name in hieroglyphs
M8 A M17 M17 A40

Genealogy
- Spouse: Meskhenet (some accounts); Renenutet (some accounts)

Equivalents
- Greek: Agathodaemon

Shai (also spelt Sai, occasionally Shay, and in Greek, Psais) was the deification of the concept of fate in Egyptian mythology. As a concept, with no particular reason for associating one gender over another, Shai was sometimes considered female, rather than the more usual understanding of being male, in which circumstance Shai was referred to as Shait (simply the feminine form of the name). His name reflects his function, as it means "(that which is) ordained."

The Egyptians believed that Shai determined the length of each person’s life and was born with each person at their birth and remained at their side until they faced their final judgement before Osiris in the underworld Duat. In consequence, he was sometimes identified as the husband of Meskhenet, goddess of birth, or, in later years, of Renenutet, who assigned the Ren, and had become considered goddess of fortune. Because of the power associated in the concept, Akhenaten, in introducing monotheism, said that Shai was an attribute of Aten, whereas Ramses II claimed to be "lord of Shai" (i.e. "lord of fate").

During Ptolemaic Egypt, Shai, as god of fate, was identified with the Greek god Agathodaemon, who was the god of fortune telling. Thus, since Agathodaemon was considered to be a serpent, and the word "Shai" was also the Egyptian word for "pig", in the Hellenic period, Shai was sometimes depicted as a serpent-headed pig, known to Egyptologists as the "Shai animal".
