= Anthelioi =

Anthelioi (Ancient Greek: Ἀνθήλιοι δαίμονες) or Antelii or Anthelii were certain divinities whose images stood before the doors of houses, and were exposed to the sun, from which they derived their name, which is literally "gods that face the sun". The sun conceptually was to animate the statues with its pneuma.

These deities were similar in character to a number of other gateway-gods, including Cardea, and Apollo under the epithet Apollo Thyraeus, protector of doorways.
