= Koalemos =

Mythological character

It's commonly believed that, in Greek mythology, Koalemos (Ancient Greek: κοάλεμος, Classical Latin: Coalemus) is the deity or daemon of stupidity, found in a play by Aristophanes and a book by Plutarch.

An ancient, unsupported false etymology derives κοάλεμος from κοέω (koeō) meaning "to perceive" and ἡλεός (ēleos) meaning "distraught, crazed".

== Aristophanes' The Knights ==
In The Knights, a satirical play written by Athenian comic playwright Aristophanes, Demosthenes converses with a sausage seller, saying, "...Continue doing exactly what you do: mix public affairs, and always win the people with flattering words. The other things are most fitting for a demagogue: you have a foul voice, you have a perverse nature, and you are of the market. Inhabiting you are all things necessary for polity. The oracles are in your favor, even that of Delphi; but crown and libate Koalemos"

Many translations add "the god of stupidity" to the near-end of this obviously satirical speech by Demosthenes, but such is not found within the original Greek text.

== Plutarch's Life of Cimon ==
In Life of Cimon, Greek philosopher Plutarch writes, "...He (Cimon) had the bad name of being dissolute and bibulous, and of taking after his grandfather (Cimon Coalemus), who, they say, because of his simplicity, was dubbed Coalemus (the Stupid-One)..."

Here, Koalemos is a nickname referring to the grandfather of Cimon, whose name was also Cimon. There is no indication given by Plutarch that Koalemos refers to a deity or daemon.
