= Cacodemon =

Evil spirit or demon

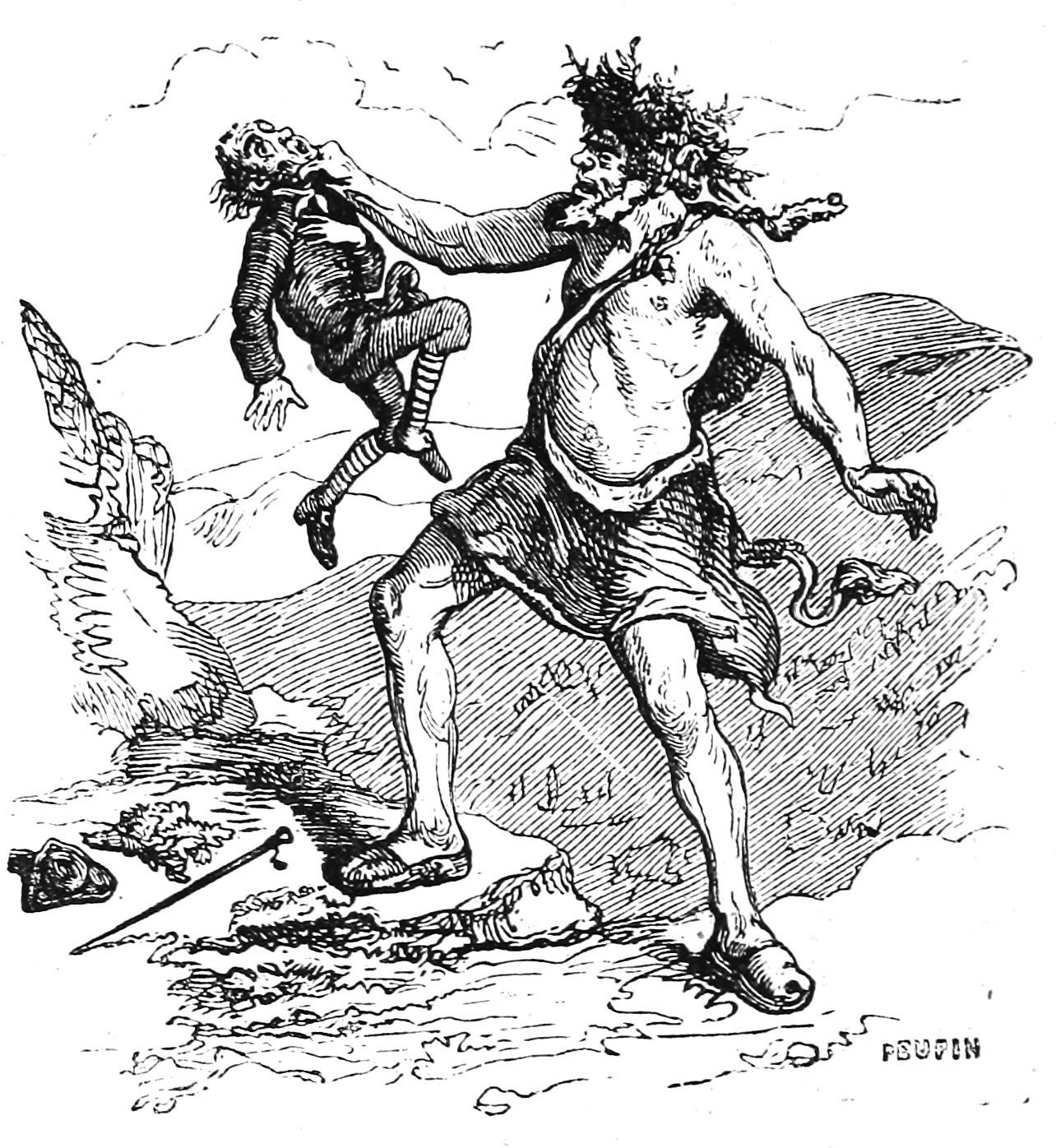
- Louis Le Breton's illustration of a cacodemon from the Dictionnaire Infernal (1863)

Creature information
- Other name: Cacodaemon
- Grouping: Evil spirit
- Sub grouping: Demon

A cacodemon (also spelled cacodaemon, cacodaimon, kakodemon, kakodaemon, or kakodaimon) is an evil spirit or (in the modern sense of the word) a demon. The opposite of a cacodemon is an agathodaemon or eudaemon, a good spirit or angel. The word cacodemon comes through Latin from the Ancient Greek κακοδαίμων kakodaimōn, meaning an "evil spirit", whereas daimon would be a neutral spirit in Greek. It is believed to be capable of shapeshifting. A cacodemon is also said to be a malevolent person. A cacodemon is depicted as a horned (or winged browed) youth with oversized genitalia trailing between his legs in Greek mythology.

In psychology, cacodemonia (or cacodemonomania) is a form of insanity in which the patient believes that they are possessed by an evil spirit. The first known occurrence of the word cacodemon dates to 1593.

In astrology, the 12th house was once called the Cacodemon for its association with evil. Defined as "a noise-making devil", Jane Davidson has noted an illustrated example of a cacodemon in editions of Ulisse Aldrovandi's Monstrum Historia (Story of Monsters) as late as 1696.

== Examples ==
- There is a painting by Paul Klee called Cacodaemonic (1916).
- In William Shakespeare's Richard III Act 1 Scene 3, Queen Margaret calls Richard a "cacodemon" for his foul deeds and manipulations.
- In John Fletcher's The Knight of Malta, Norandine calls Mountferrat, the play's villain, a "cacodemon" in the final scene.
- A cacodemon enemy appears in the Doom video game series, starting with the first game in 1993.
- In the Rick Riordan novels The Sun and the Star and The Court of the Dead, a dozen cacodemons are created by the primordial goddess Nyx out of Nico di Angelo's emotions. Affectionately dubbed the Cocoa Puffs, the cacodemons act as embodiments of Nico's various emotions and help him and Will Solace out on their quests.

== See also ==
- Ancient Greek religion
- Genius – Divine nature in ancient Roman religion
- Greek mythology – Body of myths originating in ancient Greece
- Jinn – Supernatural beings in Arab culture and Islam
