= Muslim conquests =

The Muslim conquests, Muslim invasions, Islamic conquests, including Arab conquests, Arab Islamic conquests, also Iranian Muslim conquests, Turkic Muslim conquests etc.

- Early Muslim conquests
  - Ridda Wars
  - Muslim conquest of Persia
    - Muslim conquest of Khorasan
    - Muslim conquest of Pars
    - Muslim conquest of Khuzestan
    - Muslim conquest of Northern Persia
      - Muslim conquest of Kerman
  - Muslim conquest of the Levant
  - Muslim conquest of Jerusalem
  - Muslim conquest of Egypt
- Muslim conquest of Transoxiana
- Muslim conquest of Armenia
- Muslim conquests of Afghanistan
  - Muslim conquest of Sistan
- Muslim conquest of Azerbaijan
- Muslim conquest of the Maghreb
- Muslim conquest of Spain
- Muslim conquests in Italy
  - Muslim conquest of Sicily
- Muslim conquests in the Indian subcontinent
  - Umayyad conquest of Sindh
  - Ghaznavid Campaign in India
  - Ghurid campaign in India
  - Ghurid conquest of Bengal
  - Dehli Sultanate conquests
  - Bahmani Sultanate conquests
  - Deccan Sultanate conquests
  - Mughal conquests
  - Bengal Sultanate conquests
    - Bengal Sultanate conquest of Orissa
    - Bengal Sultanate conquest of Assam
    - Bengal conquest of Arakan
  - Muslim conquest of Assam
- Kara-Khanid conquest of Xinjiang
- Seljuk conquest of Turkey
- Ottoman conquests in Europe

== See also ==
- Spread of Islam
- Arab–Byzantine wars
- List of Ottoman conquests, sieges and landings
