= Agathodaemon =

Spirit (daemon) of the vineyards and grainfields in ancient Greek religion

Agathos Daimon
- Fertility, grain, health
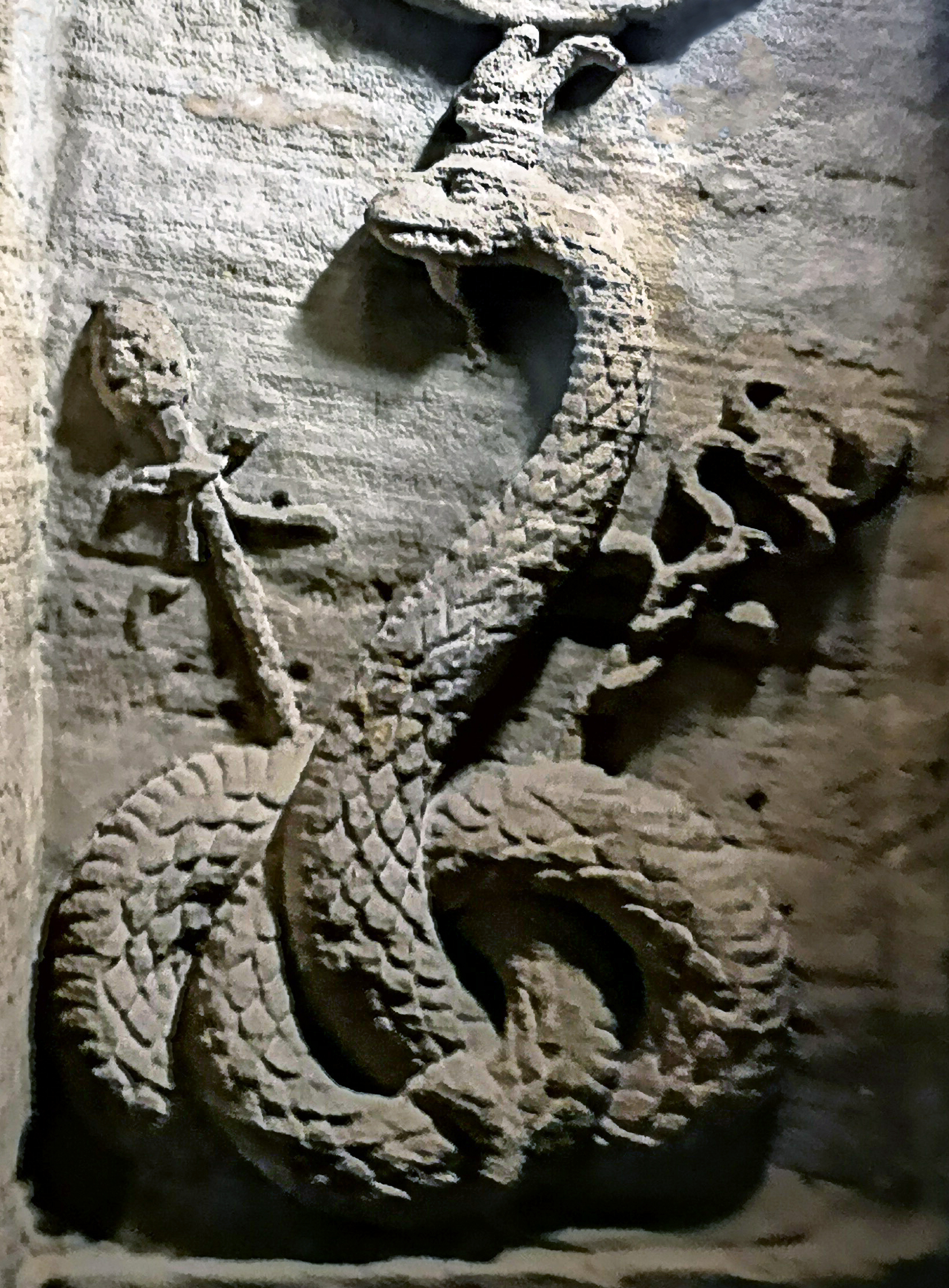
- Agathos Daimon wearing a pschent, the double crown of Egypt, holding a thyrsus (left) and a caduceus (right)
- Major cult centre: Alexandria, Egypt
- Animals: Snakes
- Symbol: Horn of Plenty
- Day: 2 February (Gregorian); 25 Tybi (Egyptian)
- Gender: Male
- Consort: Tyche Agathe

Equivalents
- Pre-Ptolemaic Egyptian: Shai

Agathos Daimon (Ancient Greek: ἀγαθὸς δαίμων, agathós daímōn, lit. 'noble spirit') (Note: Sometimes written as Agathodaemon (Ancient Greek: ἀγαθοδαίμων, agathodaímōn)) originally was a lesser deity (daemon) of classical ancient Greek religion and Graeco-Egyptian religion. In his original Greek form, he served as a household god, to whom, along with Zeus Soter, libations were made after a meal. In later Ptolemaic antiquity he took on two partially distinct roles: one as the Agathos Daimon, a prominent serpentine civic god, who served as the special protector of Alexandria; the other as a genus of serpentine household gods, the Agathoi Daimones, individual protectors of the homes in which they were worshipped.

== Early history ==
Agathos Daimon was attested in domestic context in Greece as early as the fifth century BC, and yet he was typically not represented there in the form of a snake, as opposed to in Alexandria, where he was abundantly so represented.

"His origin in Alexandria is a matter of dispute, with two conflicting views either painting Agathos Daimon as a Greek cultural importation later identified with Serapis and with Egyptian gods Šai (Shai), Knephis (Kneph), Khnum, Soknopis, or as a Hellenized native Egyptian household god. Quaegebeur points out the near absence of Greek sources of the Ptolemaic age for the cult of Agathos Daimon, contrasted with the abundance of Egyptian attestations of the god Šai in this age and the poignant evidence of the Oracle of the Potter ..."

The Oracle of the Potter, an Egyptian nationalistic text, predicted the coming doom of Alexandria, with the local gods Kneph (also often represented as a serpent) and Agathos Daimon leaving the city for Memphis, and the defeat of the Macedonian invaders, and their 'age of chaos'.

== Greek classical period ==
Though he is noted in Greek mythology (Pausanias conjectured that the name was merely an epithet of Zeus), it was customary to drink or pour out a few drops of unmixed wine to honor the Agathos Daimon after a meal. In Aristophanes' Peace, when War has trapped Peace (Εἰρήνη Eirene) in a deep pit, Hermes comes to give aid: "Now, oh Greeks! is the moment when, freed of quarrels and fighting, we should rescue sweet Eirene and draw her out of this pit... This is the moment to drain a cup in honor of the Agathos Daimon." A temple dedicated to them was situated on the road from Megalopolis to Maenalus in Arcadia.

Agathos Daimon was the spouse or companion of Tyche Agathe (Τύχη Ἀγαθή, "Good Fortune"). "Tyche we know at Lebadeia as the wife of the Agathos Daimon, the Good or Rich Spirit". Their numinous presence could be represented in art as a serpent or more concretely as a young man bearing a cornucopia and a bowl in one hand, and a poppy and an ear of grain in the other.

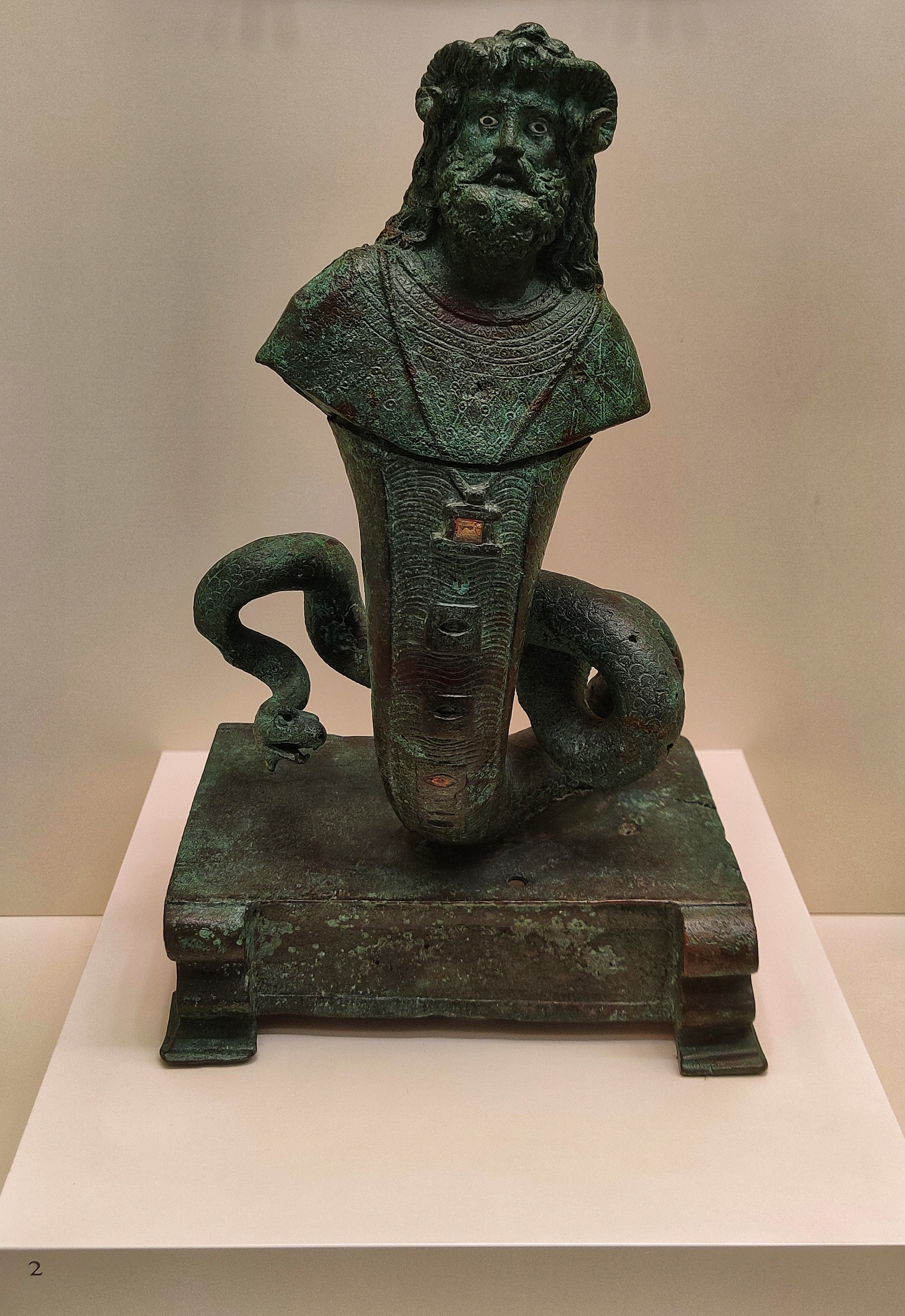
Copper statuette of the god Sarapis Amun Agathodaemon. National Archaeological Museum, Athens

Agathos Daimon was also identified with Zeus Meilichios, as well as with Serapis.

In Egypt, a similar deity was Shai, who was known as the god of fate. His worship went back as far as the time of Akhenaten in the New Kingdom.

== Egyptian late antiquity ==
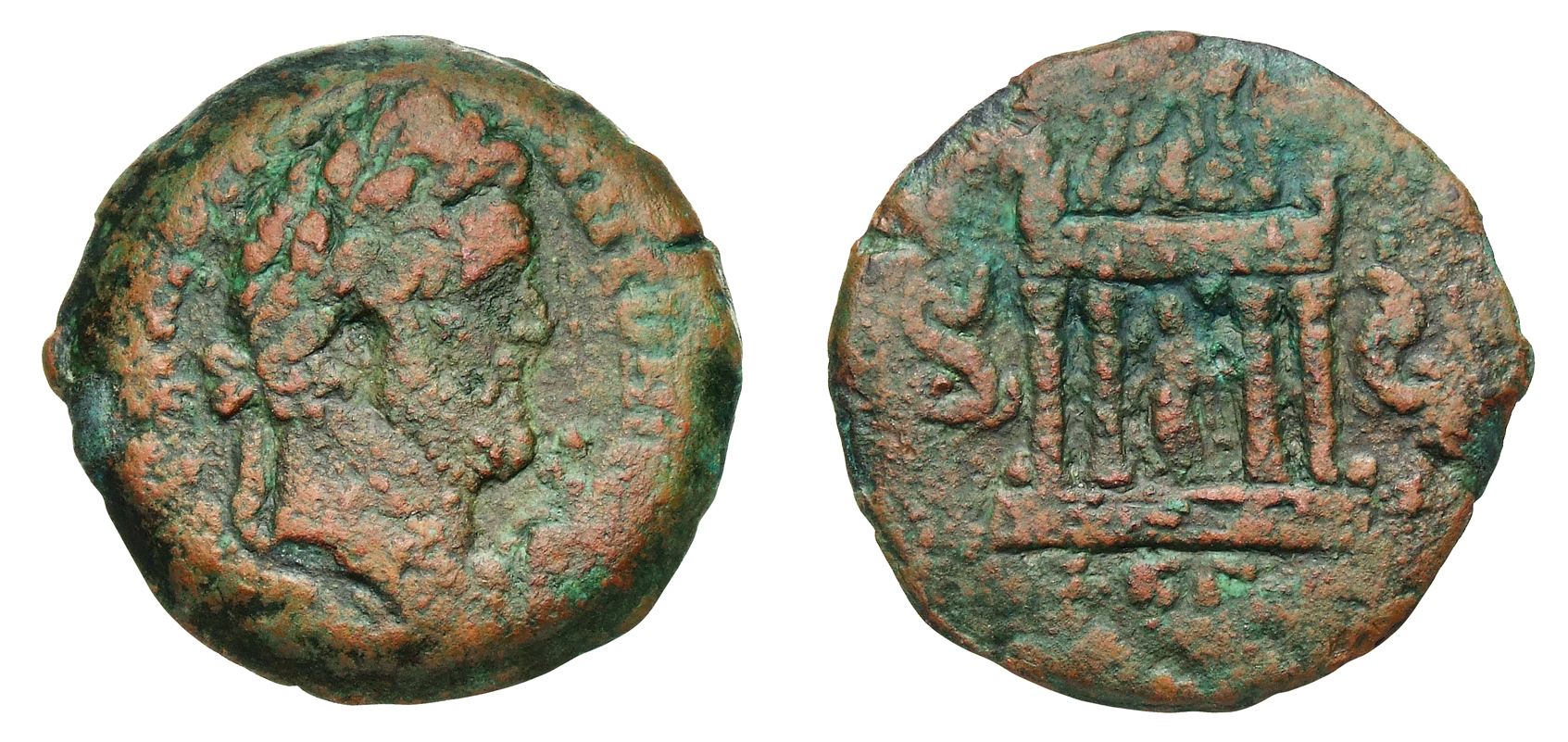
Coin of Antoninus Pius, 160 AD from Alexandria, Egypt. On the reverse to the left, a serpent portrayal of Agathodaimon; to the right, a portrayals of an Uraeus serpent.

In the syncretic atmosphere of late Antiquity, agathodaemons could be bound up with Egyptian bringers of security and good fortune: a gem carved with magic emblems bears the images of Serapis with crocodile, sun-lion and Osiris mummy surrounded by the lion-headed snake Chnum–Agathodaemon–Aion, with Harpocrates on the reverse.

== As a Harranian prophet ==
According to Al-Biruni, the Harranians had a prophet known as Aghathadhimun. other Muslims said of this figure that he invented a clock that could lure the snakes, scorpions and other reptiles out their holes. Ibn al-Nadim lists him among the foremost alchemists.

== See also ==
- Cacodaemon
- Eudaemon
- Genius

== Bibliography ==
- Harrison, Jane Ellen (1922). Prolegomena to the Study of Greek Religion (3rd ed.). pp. 355–ff, 543.
