= Timeline of science and engineering in the Muslim world =

This timeline of science and engineering in the Muslim world covers the time period from the eighth century AD to the introduction of European science to the Muslim world in the nineteenth century. All year dates are given according to the Gregorian calendar except where noted.

== Eighth century ==
=== Astronomy and astrology ===
- d 777 CE Ibrāhīm al-Fazārī Ibrahim ibn Habib ibn Sulayman ibn Samura ibn Jundab al-Fazari (Arabic: إبراهيم بن حبيب بن سليمان بن سمرة بن جندب الفزاري) (died 777 CE) was an 8th-century Muslim mathematician and astronomer at the Abbasid court of the Caliph Al-Mansur (r. 754–775). He should not be confused with his son Muḥammad ibn Ibrāhīm al-Fazārī, also an astronomer. He composed various astronomical writings ("On the astrolabe", "On the armillary spheres", "On the calendar").
- d 796 Muhammad ibn Ibrahim ibn Habib ibn Sulayman ibn Samra ibn Jundab al-Fazari (Arabic: إبراهيم بن حبيب بن سليمان بن سمرة بن جندب الفزاري) (died 796 or 806) was a Muslim philosopher, mathematician and astronomer. He is not to be confused with his father Ibrāhīm al-Fazārī, also an astronomer and mathematician. Some sources refer to him as an Arab, other sources state that he was a Persian. Al-Fazārī translated many scientific books into Arabic and Persian. He is credited with building the first astrolabe in the Islamic world. Along with Yaʿqūb ibn Ṭāriq and his father, he helped translate the Indian astronomical text by Brahmagupta (fl. 7th century), the Brāhmasphuṭasiddhānta, into Arabic as Az-Zīj ‛alā Sinī al-‛Arab., or the Sindhind. This translation was possibly the vehicle by means of which the Hindu numerals were transmitted from India to Islam.

=== Mathematics ===
- 780 – 850: al-Khwarizmi Developed the "calculus of resolution and juxtaposition" (hisab al-jabr w'al-muqabala), more briefly referred to as al-jabr or algebra.

== Ninth century ==
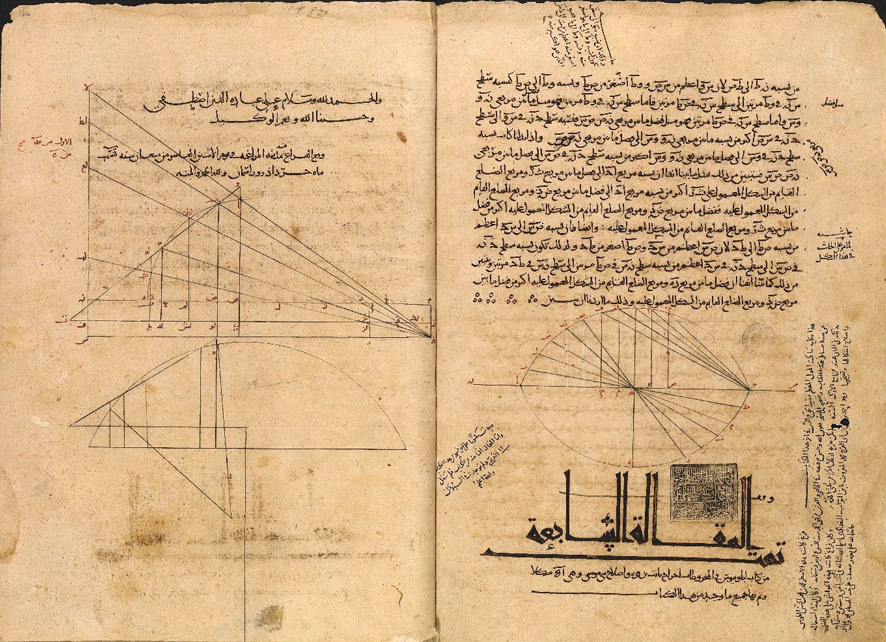
The Conica of Apollonius of Perga, "the great geometer", translated into Arabic in the ninth century

=== Chemistry ===
- 801 – 873: al-Kindi writes on the distillation of wine as that of rose water and gives 107 recipes for perfumes, in his book Kitab Kimia al-'otoor wa al-tas`eedat ("Book of the Chemistry of Perfumes and Distillations").
- 865 – 925: al-Razi wrote on Naft (naphtha or petroleum) and its distillates in his book Kitab sirr al-asrar ("Book of the Secret of Secrets"). When choosing a site to build Baghdad's hospital, he hung pieces of fresh meat in different parts of the city. The location where the meat took the longest to rot was the one he chose for building the hospital. He advocated that patients not be told their real condition so that fear or despair would not affect the healing process. He wrote on the various uses of alkali, caustic soda, soap and glycerine, and gave descriptions of equipment processes and methods in his book.

=== Mathematics ===
- 826 – 901: Thabit ibn Qurra (Latinized: Thebit.) studied at Baghdad's House of Wisdom under the Banu Musa brothers. Discovered a theorem that enables pairs of amicable numbers to be found. Later, al-Baghdadi (b. 980) developed a variant of the theorem.

=== Miscellaneous ===
- c. 810: Bayt al-Hikma (House of Wisdom) set up in Baghdad. There Greek and Indian mathematical and astronomy works are translated into Arabic.
- 810 – 887: Abbas ibn Firnas. Planetarium, artificial crystals. According to one account that was written seven centuries after his death, Ibn Firnas was injured during an elevated winged trial flight.

== Tenth century ==
By this century, three systems of counting were used in the Arab world: finger-reckoning arithmetic, with numerals written entirely in words, used by the business community; the sexagesimal system, a remnant originating with the Babylonians, with numerals denoted by letters of the Arabic alphabet and used by Arab mathematicians in astronomical work; and the Indian numeral system, which was used with various sets of symbols. Its arithmetic at first required the use of a dust board (a sort of handheld blackboard) because "the methods required moving the numbers around in the calculation and rubbing some out as the calculation proceeded."

=== Chemistry ===
- 957: Abul Hasan Ali Al-Masudi, wrote on the reaction of alkali water with zaj (vitriol) water giving sulfuric acid.

=== Mathematics ===
- 920: al-Uqlidisi. Modified arithmetic methods for the Indian numeral system to make it possible for pen and paper use. Hitherto, doing calculations with the Indian numerals necessitated the use of a dust board as noted earlier.
- 940: Born Abu'l-Wafa al-Buzjani. Wrote several treatises using the finger-counting system of arithmetic and was also an expert on the Indian numerals system. About the Indian system, he wrote: "[It] did not find application in business circles and among the population of the Eastern Caliphate for a long time." Using the Indian numeral system, abu'l Wafa was able to extract roots.
- 980: al-Baghdadi Studied a slight variant of Thabit ibn Qurra's theorem on amicable numbers. Al-Baghdadi also wrote about and compared the three systems of counting and arithmetic used in the region during this period.

== Eleventh century ==
=== Mathematics ===
- 1048 – 1131: Omar Khayyam. Persian mathematician and poet. "Gave a complete classification of cubic equations with geometric solutions found by means of intersecting conic sections." Extracted roots using the decimal system (the Indian numeral system).

== Twelfth century ==
=== Cartography ===
- 1100–1165: Muhammad al-Idrisi, aka Idris al-Saqalli aka al-sharif al-idrissi of Andalusia and Sicily. Known for having drawn some of the most advanced ancient world maps.

=== Mathematics ===
- 1130–1180: Al-Samawal. An important member of al-Karaji's school of algebra. Gave this definition of algebra: "[it is concerned] with operating on unknowns using all the arithmetical tools, in the same way as the arithmetician operates on the known."
- 1135: Sharaf al-Din al-Tusi. Follows al-Khayyam's application of algebra of geometry, rather than follow the general development that came through al-Karaji's school of algebra. Wrote a treatise on cubic equations which describes thus: "[the treatise] represents an essential contribution to another algebra which aimed to study curves by means of equations, thus inaugurating the beginning of algebraic geometry." (quoted in ).

== Thirteenth century ==
=== Chemistry ===
- Al-Jawbari describes the preparation of rose water in the work "Book of Selected Disclosure of Secrets" (Kitab kashf al-Asrar).
- Materials; glassmaking: Arabic manuscript on the manufacture of false gemstones and diamonds. Also describes spirits of alum, spirits of saltpetre and spirits of salts (hydrochloric acid).
- An Arabic manuscript written in Syriac script gives description of various chemical materials and their properties such as sulfuric acid, sal-ammoniac, saltpetre and zaj (vitriol).

=== Mathematics ===
- 1260: al-Farisi. Gave a new proof of Thabit ibn Qurra's theorem, introducing important new ideas concerning factorization and combinatorial methods. He also gave the pair of amicable numbers 17296, 18416 which have also been joint attributed to Fermat as well as Thabit ibn Qurra.

=== Astronomy ===
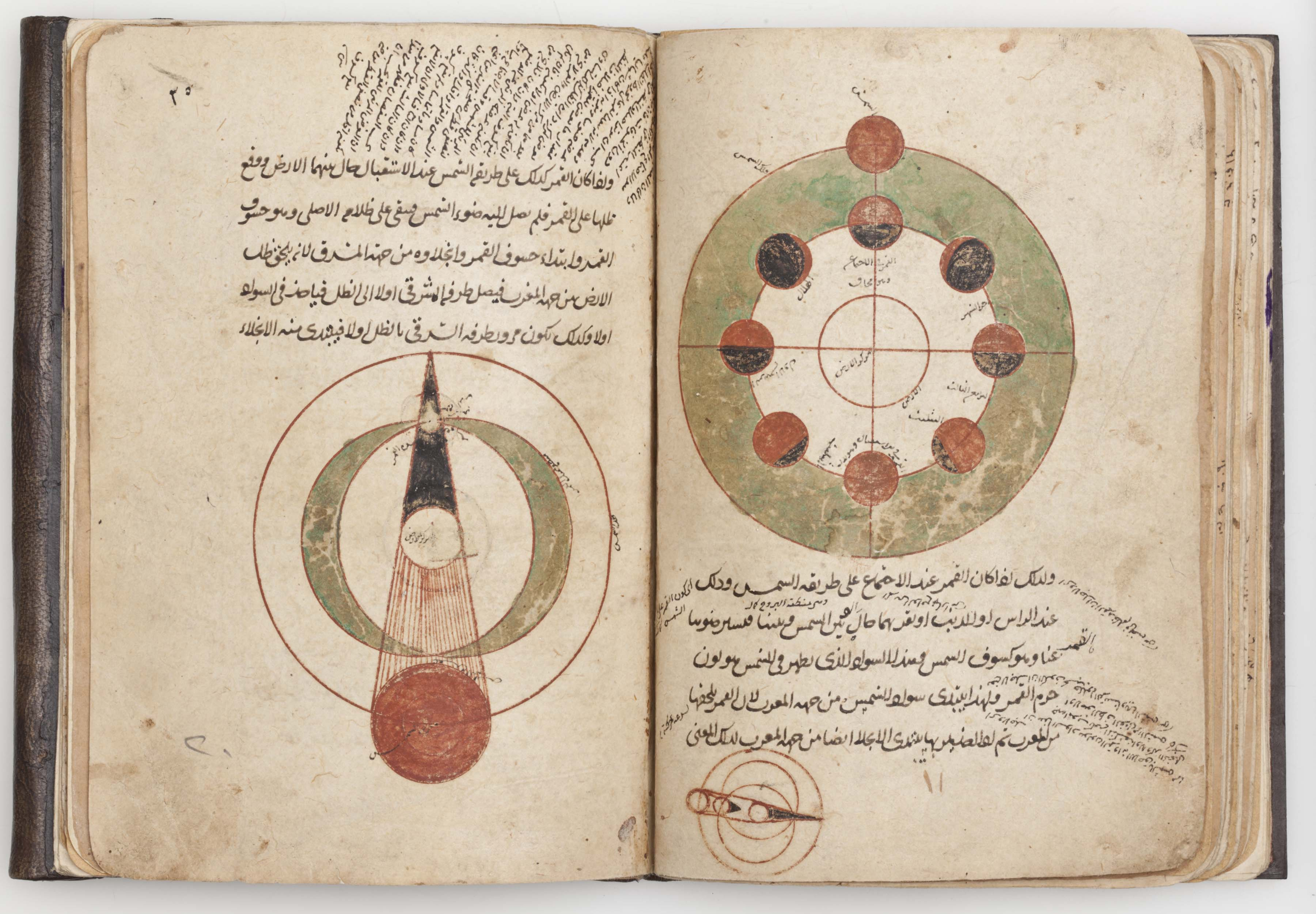
Manuscript of al-Mulakhkhas fi al-Hay’ah in the Khalili Collection of Islamic Art

- Jaghmini completed the al-Mulakhkhas fi al-Hay’ah ("Epitome of plain theoretical astronomy"), an astronomical textbook which spawned many commentaries and whose educational use lasted until the 18th century.

=== Miscellaneous ===
- Mechanical engineering: Ismail al-Jazari described 100 mechanical devices, some 80 of which are trick vessels of various kinds, along with instructions on how to construct them.
- Medicine; Scientific method: Ibn Al-Nafis (1213–1288) Damascene physician and anatomist. Discovered the lesser circulatory system (the cycle involving the ventricles of the heart and the lungs) and described the mechanism of breathing and its relation to the blood and how it nourishes on air in the lungs. Followed a "constructivist" path of the smaller circulatory system: "blood is purified in the lungs for the continuance of life and providing the body with the ability to work". During his time, the common view was that blood originates in the liver then travels to the right ventricle, then on to the organs of the body; another contemporary view was that blood is filtered through the diaphragm where it mixes with the air coming from the lungs. Ibn al-Nafis discredited all these views including ones by Galen and Avicenna (ibn Sina). At least an illustration of his manuscript is still extant. William Harvey explained the circulatory system without reference to ibn al-Nafis in 1628. Ibn al-Nafis extolled the study of comparative anatomy in his "Explaining the dissection of [Avicenna's] Al-Qanoon" which includes a preface, and citations of sources. Emphasized the rigours of verification by measurement, observation and experiment. Subjected conventional wisdom of his time to a critical review and verified it with experiment and observation, discarding errors.

== Fourteenth century ==
=== Astronomy ===
- 1393–1449: Ulugh Beg commissions an observatory at Samarqand in present-day Uzbekistan.

=== Mathematics ===
- 1380–1429: al-Kashi. According to, "contributed to the development of decimal fractions not only for approximating algebraic numbers, but also for real numbers such as pi. His contribution to decimal fractions is so major that for many years he was considered as their inventor. Although not the first to do so, al-Kashi gave an algorithm for calculating nth roots which is a special case of the methods given many centuries later by Ruffini and Horner."

== Fifteenth century ==
=== Mathematics ===
- Ibn al-Banna and al-Qalasadi used symbols for mathematics "and, although we do not know exactly when their use began, we know that symbols were used at least a century before this."

== Seventeenth century ==
=== Mathematics ===
- The Persian mathematician Muhammad Baqir Yazdi discovered the pair of amicable numbers 9,363,584 and 9,437,056 for which he is jointly credited with Descartes.
- A seventeenth-century celestial globe was made by Diya’ ad-din Muhammad in Lahore, 1663 (now in Pakistan). It is now housed at the National Museum of Scotland. It is encircled by a meridian ring and a horizon ring. The latitude angle of 32° indicates that the globe was made in the Lahore workshop. This specific 'workshop claims 21 signed globes—the largest number from a single shop’ making this globe a good example of Celestial Globe production at its peak.

== Modern science ==
Muslim scientists made significant contributions to modern science. These include the development of the electroweak unification theory by Abdus Salam, development of femtochemistry by Ahmed Zewail, invention of the graphite anode for lithium-ion battery by Rachid Yazami, invention of quantum dots by Moungi Bawendi, and development of fuzzy set theory by Lotfi A. Zadeh. Other major contributions include introduction of Kardar–Parisi–Zhang equation by Mehran Kardar, the development of Circuit topology by Alireza Mashaghi, and the first description of Behçet's disease by Hulusi Behçet.

Contributions of Muslim scientists have been recognized by 4 Nobel Prizes. Abdus Salam was the first Muslim to win a Nobel Prize in science. Rachid Yazami was the first Arab engineer to win the Draper Prize, considered the Nobel in engineering.

== See also ==
- Arab Agricultural Revolution
- Islamic Golden Age
- Science in the medieval Islamic world
- Ibn Sina Academy of Medieval Medicine and Sciences
- List of inventions in the medieval Islamic world
- Muslim women in science and technology
