= Indian influence on Islamic science =

Aspect of the Golden Age of Islam

The Islamic Golden Age, which saw a flourishing of science, notably mathematics and astronomy, especially during the 9th and 10th centuries, had a notable Indian influence.

During this era, Baghdad stood as the Islamic world's foremost hub of intellectual activity. The Abbasid leaders in Baghdad quickly recognized their populace's limited understanding in fields like astronomy, mathematics, and medicine. They turned their attention to India and Persia for advanced knowledge. Possession of Sind provided the Abbasids with a crucial pathway to access Indian expertise. This period saw the visit of an Indian astronomer-mathematician and diplomat from Sind, Kanaka, to Caliph Al-Mansur's court (754–775). Intrigued by Indian astronomy and mathematics, the caliph instructed Ibrahim al-Fazari and Yaqub ibn Tariq to translate Brahmagupta's significant texts, Brahmasphutasiddhanta and Khandakhadyaka. These translations, named Sindhind and Arkand, introduced the concept of Indian numerals to the Islamic world. Similarly, Persian astronomical tables influenced by Indian astronomy, Zig-I shahriyarr, were translated into Arabic as Zijashshahriyar. The ninth-century scholar al-Khwarizmi, who learned Sanskrit, played a pivotal role in disseminating the Indian numeral system globally. Another contemporary scholar, al-Kindi, authored four books on Indian numerals.

Indian medical practices and pharmaceuticals were also highly sought after in the Islamic world. Numerous Sanskrit medical texts were translated into Arabic, sponsored by Khalid ibn Barmak, Al-Mansur's vizier. Khalid, originally from a Buddhist family in Balkh, converted to Islam after the Arab conquest. His family, known as the Barmakis of Baghdad, showed a keen interest in Indian innovations. Under Caliph Harun al-Rashid (788–809), the translation of Susruta Samhita into Arabic was commissioned. Furthermore, the notable Arabic medical work Kitab Al-Hawi, later translated into Latin as Liber continens in the 13th century, was penned by al-Razi, or Rhazes (865–925), incorporating substantial Indian medical knowledge.

== History ==
For the best part of a millennium, from the Seleucid era and through to the Sassanid period, there had been an exchange of scholarship between the Greek, Persian and Indian cultural spheres. The origin of the number zero and the place-value system notably falls into this period; its early use originates in Indian mathematics of the 5th century (Lokavibhaga), influencing Sassanid era Persian scholars during the 6th century.

The sudden Islamic conquest of Persia in the 640s drove a wedge between the Mediterranean and Indian traditions, but scholarly transfer soon resumed, with translations of both Greek and Sanskrit works into Arabic during the 8th century. This triggered the flourishing of Abbasid-era scholarship centered in Baghdad in the 9th century, and the eventual resumption of transmission to the west via Muslim Spain and Sicily by the 10th century.

There was continuing contact between Indian and Perso-Arabic scholarship during the 9th to 11th centuries while the Muslim conquest of India was temporarily halted. Al-Biruni in the early 11th century traveled widely in India and became an important source of knowledge about India in the Islamic world during that time.

With the establishment of the Delhi Sultanate in the 13th century, northern India fell under Perso-Arabic dominance and the native Sanskrit tradition fell into decline, while at about the same time the "Golden Age of Islam" of the Arab caliphates gave way to Turko-Mongol dominance, leading to the flourishing of a secondary "Golden Age" of Turko-Persian literary tradition during the 13th to 16th centuries, exemplified on either side of Timurid Persia by the Ottoman Empire in the west and the Mughal Empire in the east.

== Astronomy ==
The mathematical astronomy text Brahmasiddhanta of Brahmagupta (598-668) was received in the court of Al-Mansur (753–774). It was translated by Alfazari into Arabic as Az-Zīj ‛alā Sinī al-‛Arab, popularly called Sindhind. This translation was the means by which the Hindu numerals were transmitted from the Sanskrit to the Arabic tradition. According to Al-Biruni,

As Sindh was under the actual rule of the Khalif Mansur (AD 753–774), there came embassies from that part of India to Bagdad and among them scholars, who brought with them two books.
With the help of these Pandits Alfazari, perhaps also Yaqūb ibn Tāriq, translated them. Both works have been largely used, and have exercised a great influence. It was on this occasion that the Arabs first became acquainted with a scientific system of astronomy. They learned from Brahmagupta earlier than Ptolemy.

— Alberuni (Ed. & trans. Edward Sachau), Alberuni's India [The Indika of Alberuni] (1910)

Alberuni's translator and editor Edward Sachau wrote: "It is Brahmagupta who taught Arabs mathematics before they got acquainted with Greek science." Al-Fazari also translated the Khandakhadyaka (Arakand) of Brahmagupta.

Through the resulting Arabic translations of Sindhind and Arakand, the use of Indian numerals became established in the Islamic world.

== Mathematics ==
The etymology of the word "sine" comes from the Latin mistranslation of the word jiba, which is an Arabic transliteration of the Sanskrit word for half the chord, jya-ardha.

The sin and cos functions of trigonometry, were important mathematical concepts, imported from the Gupta period of Indian astronomy namely the jyā and koṭi-jyā functions via translation of texts like the Aryabhatiya and Surya Siddhanta, from Sanskrit to Arabic, and then from Arabic to Latin, and later to other European languages.

Al-Khowarizmi (ca. 840) contributed a work on algebra and an account of the Hindu—Arabic numerals including the use of zero as a place-holder...the history of early Hindu mathematics has always presented considerable problems for the West...it is still not possible to form a clear picture of either method or motivation in Hindu mathematics...this, together with the absence of any formalised proof structure, militated against continuous mathematical development...much of the Hindu approach to mathematics was certainly conveyed to western Europe through Arabs. The Algebraic method formerly considered to have been invented by Al Khowarizimi can now be seen to stem from Hindu sources. The place-value system involving the use of nine numerals and a zero as place-holder is undoubtedly of Hindu origin and its transmission to the West had a profound influence on the whole course of mathematics.

As in the rest of mathematical science so in Trigonometry, were the Arabs pupils of the Hindus and still more of the Greeks, but not without important devices of their own.

For over five hundred years Arabic writers and others continued to apply to works on arithmetic the name Indian.

Another important early treatise that publicized decimal numbers was the Iranian mathematician and astronomer Kushyar ibn Labban's leading arithmetic book Kitab fi usul hisab al-hind (principals of Hindu reckoning).

Abu'l-Hasan al-Uqlidisi a scholar in the Abbasid caliphate wrote al-Fusul fi al-Hisab al-Hindi ("chapters in Indian calculation") to address the difficulty in procedures for calculation from the Euclid's Elements and endorsed the use of Indian calculation. He highlighted its ease of use, speed, fewer requirements of memory and the focused scope on the subject.

Professor J. Ginsburg states:

"Hindu notation was carried to Arabia about AD 770 by a Hindu scholar named Kanka who was invited from Ujjain to the famous court of Baghdad by Abbaside Khalif Ali-Mansur. Kanka taught Hindu Astronomy and Mathematics to Arab scholars and with his help, they translated ‘Brāhma-Sphuta-Siddhanta’ of Brahma Gupta."

The historical transmission of these numerals is further supported by the work of French savant M. F. Nau, who proved that Hindu numerals were well known and highly appreciated in Syria around the middle of the seventh century AD. Similarly, regarding the subsequent journey of these numerals into the Europe, B.B. Datta states:

"From Arabia, the numerals slowly marched towards the west through Egypt and North Arabia and they finally entered Europe in the 11th century. The Europeans called them the Arabic notations because they received from Arabs. But the Arabs themselves, the Eastern as well as the Western, have unanimously called them the Hindu figures (Al-Arqan-Al-Hindu)."

== Medical texts ==
Mankah, an Indian physician at the court of Harun al-Rashid translated the Sushruta (the classical (Gupta-era) Sanskrit text on medicine) into Persian.

A large number of Sanskrit medical, pharmacological and toxicological texts were translated into Arabic under the patronage of Khalid, the vizier of Al-Mansur. Khalid was the son of a chief priest of a Buddhist monastery at Balkh. Some of his family was killed when the Arabs captured Balkh; others including Khalid survived by converting to Islam. They were to be known as the Barmakids of Baghdad who were fascinated by the new ideas from India. Indian medical knowledge was given a further boost under the Caliph Harun al Rashid (788–809) who ordered the translation of Susruta Samhita into Arabic.

We know of Yahya ibn Khalid al Barmaki (805) as a patron of physicians and, specifically, of the translation of Hindu medical works into both Arabic and Persian. In all likelihood however, his activity took place in the orbit of the caliphate court in Iraq, where at the behest of Harun al Rashid (786–809), such books were translated into Arabic. Thus Khurasan and Transoxania were effectively bypassed in this transfer of learning from India to Islam, even though, undeniably the Barmakis cultural outlook owed something to their land of origin, northern Afghanistan, and Yahya al Barmaki's interest in medicine may have derived from no longer identifiable family tradition.

The Caraka Saṃhitā was translated into Persian and subsequently into Arabic by Abd-Allah ibn Ali in the ninth century.

Probably the first Islamic hospital (Bimaristan or Maristan) was established in Baghdad Yahya ibn Khalid ibn Barmak, tutor and subsequently vizier of Harun al-Rashid when the latter became Khalif in 786. Yahya ibn Khalid ibn Barmak's hospital, usually referred to as the Barmakid Hospital must have been established before 803, the year in which the Barmakid family fell from power. The hospital is mentioned in two places in the Fihrist which was written in 997. Ibn Dahn, Al Hindi, who administered the Bimaristan of the Barmak. He translated from the Indian language into Arabic. Yahya ibn Khalid ordered Mankah (Kankah) the Indian, to translate it (an Indian book of medicine) at the hospital to render it in the form of a compilation.

Al-Razi's Al-Hawi (liber continens) of c. 900 is said to contain "much Indian knowledge" from texts such as the Susruta Samhita.

== Geography ==
The Indian geographical knowledge that was transmitted and influenced the Arabs included the view of Aryabhata that the apparent daily rotation of the heavens was caused by the rotation of the earth on its own axis, the idea that the proportion of land and sea on the surface of the earth was half and half and the land mass as being dome shaped and covered on all sides by water.

The Arabs utilized the Indian cartographic system in which the northern hemisphere was considered to be the inhabited part of the earth and divided into nine parts. Its four geographical limits were djamakut in the east, rum in the west, Ceylon as the cupola (dome) and Sidpur.

Indians believed that the prime meridian passes through ujjain and calculated their longitudes from Ceylon. The Arabs adopted this idea of Ceylon's being the cupola of the earth but later mistakenly believed ujjain to be the cupola.

== See also ==
- Science and technology in India
- Indian mathematics
- Indian astronomy
- Bakhshali manuscript
- Bakhshali approximation
- Barmakids
- Indo-Persian culture
