= Fazzari =

Fazzari (pronounced [ˈfaddzari]) is a Calabrian surname of possible Arabic origin. Notable people with the surname include:

- Carlo Fazzari (born 1990), Italian rugby union player
- Michelle Fazzari (1987–2024), Canadian wrestler

== See also ==
- Al-Fazari, the possible source of this surname
