= Zij =

Medieval Islamic astronomical tables

A zij (Persian: زيج, romanized: zīj) is an Islamic astronomical book that tabulates parameters used for astronomical calculations of the positions of the sun, moon, stars, and planets.

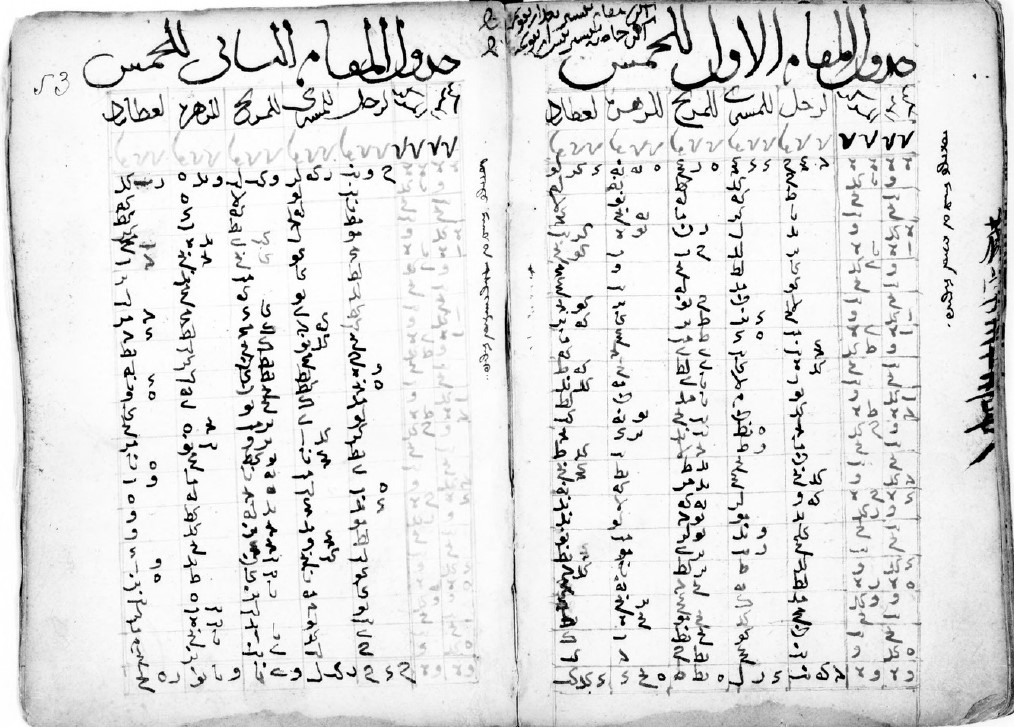
Sanjufini Zij by Samarkandi astronomer Khwaja Ghazi al-Sanjufini. Compiled in 1363.

== Etymology ==
The name zīj is derived from the Middle Persian term zih or zīg "cord". The term is believed to refer to the arrangement of threads in weaving, which was transferred to the arrangement of rows and columns in tabulated data. Some such books were referred to as qānūn, derived from the equivalent Greek word, κανών.

== Historically significant zījes ==
The Zij-i Sultani, published by the astronomer and sultan Ulugh Beg in 1438/9, was used as a reference zij throughout Islam during the early modern era. Omar Khayyam's Zij-i Malik Shahi was updated throughout the modern era under various sultanates. Zijes were updated by different empires to suit their various interests, such as the simplified version of Zij-i Sultani by the Mughal Empire.

== History ==
Some of the early zījes tabulated data from Indian planetary theory (known as the Sindhind) and from pre-Islamic Sasanian models, but most zījes presented data based on the Ptolemaic model. A small number of the zījes adopted their computations reflecting original observations but most only adopted their tables to reflect the use of a different calendar or geographic longitude as the basis for computations. Since most zījes generally followed earlier theory, their principal contributions reflected improved trigonometrical, computational and observational techniques.

The content of zījes were initially based on that of the "Handy Tables" by Ptolemy, known in Arabic as al-Qānūn, the Zīj-i Shāh compiled in Sasanian Persia, and the Indian siddhantas by Āryabhaṭa and Brahmagupta. Muslim zījes, however, were more extensive, and typically included materials on chronology, geographical latitudes and longitudes, star tables, trigonometrical functions, functions in spherical astronomy, the equation of time, planetary motions, computation of eclipses, tables for first visibility of the lunar crescent, astronomical and/or astrological computations, and instructions for astronomical calculations using epicyclic geocentric models. Some zījes go beyond this traditional content to explain or prove the theory or report the observations from which the tables were computed. Due to religious conflicts with astrology, many astronomers attempted to separate themselves from astrology, specifically intending for their zījes not to be used for astrological computations. However, many zījes were used this way regardless, such as ibn al-Shatir's al-Zij al-jadīd.

Over 200 different zījes have been identified that were produced by Islamic astronomers during the period from the eighth to the fifteenth centuries. The greatest centers of production of zījes were Baghdad under the Abbasid caliphs in the ninth century, the Maragheh observatory in the 13th century, the Samarkand observatory in the 15th century, and the Constantinople observatory of Taqi ad-Din in the 16th century. Nearly 100 more zījes were also produced in India between the 16th and 18th centuries. One of the most famous Indian zījes was the Zīj-i Muhammad Shāhī, compiled at Sawai Jai Singh's Jantar Mantar observatories in the Kingdom of Amber. It is notable for employing the use of telescopic observations. The last known zīj treatise was the Zīj-i Bahadurkhani, written in 1838 by the Indian astronomer Ghulam Hussain Jaunpuri (1760–1862) and printed in 1855, dedicated to Bahadur Khan. The treatise incorporated the heliocentric system into the zīj tradition.

== List ==
- Az-Zīj ‛alā Sinī al-‛Arab — by Ibrahim al-Fazari (d. 777) and Muhammad al-Fazari (d. 796/806)
- Az-Zīj al-Mahlul min as-Sindhind li-Darajat Daraja — by Yaʿqūb ibn Ṭāriq (d. 796)
- Zij as-Sindhind — by al-Khwarizmi (c. 780–850)
- Az-Zij as-Sabi — by Muhammad ibn Jābir al-Harrānī al-Battānī (Albatenius) (853–929)
- Zīj al-Safa'ih (Tables of the disks of the astrolabe) — by Abū Ja'far al-Khāzin (900–971)
- Zīj al-Kabir al-Hakimi — by Ibn Yunus (c. 950–1009)
- Az-Zīj al-Jamī wal-Baligh (The Comprehensive and Mature Tables) — by Kushyar ibn Labban (971–1029)
- Zīj-i Malik-Shāhī (Astronomical Handbook with Tables for Malikshah) (1079) — by Omar Khayyam (1048–1141)
- Almanac of Azarqueil (1088) — by Abū Ishāq Ibrāhīm al-Zarqālī (Azarqueil) (1028–1087)
- Tables of Toledo — based on Abū Ishāq Ibrāhīm al-Zarqālī (Azarqueil) (1028–1087)
- Az-Zīj As-Sanjarī (Sinjaric Tables) — by al-Khazini (fl. 1115–1130)
- Zij-i Ilkhani — by Nasīr al-Dīn al-Tūsī (1201–1274)
- al-Zij al-jadīd — by Ibn al-Shāṭir (1304–1375)
- Huihui Lifa (Muslim System of Calendrical Astronomy) — published in China a number of times until the early 18th century,
- Khaqani Zij — by Jamshīd al-Kāshī (1380–1429)
- Zij-i-Sultani (1437) — by Ulugh Beg (1393–1449)
- Unbored Pearl (1579–1580) — by Taqi al-Din Muhammad ibn Ma'ruf (1526–1585)
- Zīj-i Muhammad Shahi — by Jai Singh II of Amber (1688–1743)
- Zīj-i Bahadurkhani (1838) — by Ghulam Hussain Jaunpuri (1760–1862)

== See also ==
- Astrometry
- Epoch (astronomy)
- Ephemeris
- Star catalogue
