= Al-Fazari =

al-Fazari (Arabic: الفزاري) is a surname. The attributive title (nisba), Fazari, denotes an origin from Fazara ibn Dhubyan. Notable people with the surname include:

- Samura ibn Junbad al-Fazari, one of the 7th century Companions of the Prophet
- Abd Allah ibn Mas'ada al-Fazari
- Muḥammad ibn Ibrāhīm al-Fazārī, 8th century Muslim astronomer and translator
- Adi ibn Artah al-Fazari (died 720) was a governor of al-Basrah for the Umayyad dynasty, serving during the caliphate of 'Umar ibn 'Abd al-'Aziz
- Umar ibn Hubayra al-Fazari (floruit 710–724) was a prominent Umayyad general and governor of Iraq, who played an important role in the Qays–Yaman conflict of this period
- Al-Mughirah ibn Ubaydallah al-Fazari, 8th century Umayyad governor of Egypt.
- Yazid ibn Umar al-Fazari (died 750) was the last Umayyad governor of Iraq.
- Abu Ishaq al-Fazari
- Al-Abbas ibn al-Fadl ibn Ya'qub al-Fazari (died 861) was the emir of Sicily from 851 to 861

== See also ==
- Fazzari, a possible Italian derivation of this name
