= Mankah (Ancient Indian physician) =

8th-century Indian physician and translator

Mankah al-Hindi
- Born: 8th century India
- Died: 9th century Baghdad, Abbasid Caliphate
- Known for: Curing Caliph Harun al-Rashid; translating the Sushruta Samhita and texts on poisons into Persian and Arabic
- Scientific career
- Fields: Medicine, Ayurveda, Translation
- Institutions: Bimaristan of the Barmakids, Court of Harun al-Rashid

Mankah al-Hindi (also spelled Manka) was an eminent 8th-century Indian physician, medical scholar, and translator who played a foundational role in the transmission of Indian medical science to the Islamic world during the early Abbasid Caliphate, which contributed to the Islamic Golden Age.

Recruited from India to the Abbasid capital of Baghdad under the patronage of the Barmakids, Mankah famously cured Caliph Harun al-Rashid of a severe illness that had baffled court physicians. He subsequently settled in Iraq, serving as a royal physician and a central figure translating classical Sanskrit medical and toxicological treatises into Persian and Arabic.

== Biography ==
=== Early life and arrival in Baghdad ===
Little is known of Mankah's early life in India, though he was deeply educated in classical Ayurveda, philosophy, and the natural sciences.

According to the 13th-century medical historian Ibn Abi Usaibia in his Uyun al-Anba fi Tabaqat al-Atibba (History of Physicians), Caliph Harun al-Rashid (r. 786–809) fell dangerously ill with an ailment that the Greek-influenced court physicians could not cure. An Abbasid official named Abū ʿAmr al-Aʿjamī recommended Mankah, describing him as a philosopher and a physician of exceptional skill from India. Harun al-Rashid dispatched an envoy with lavish gifts to invite Mankah to Baghdad. Mankah traveled to Iraq, successfully treated the Caliph, and was rewarded with a handsome pension and imperial favor.

=== Medical and translation work ===
Following his clinical success, Mankah became closely associated with the newly established Bimaristan (hospital) of the Barmakids in Baghdad, working alongside other prominent Indian doctors like Ibn Dahn (or Dahani). Fluent in Sanskrit and Middle Persian (Pahlavi), Mankah became a vital conduit for scientific transfer.

Mankah is credited with several monumental translations:

- The Sushruta Samhita: Under the direction of Yahya ibn Khalid, Mankah translated Sushruta Samhita—the classical Sanskrit compendium on medicine and surgery—into Persian and Arabic, introducing Indian surgical methodologies and anatomical concepts to Arab scholars.
- The Treatise on Poisons: Mankah translated a highly regarded Indian toxicological text composed by Shanaq (Chanakya). The translated text was called Kitab al-Sumum (The Book of Poisons). Because Mankah spoke Sanskrit and Persian, he dictated the translation into Persian, which was then transcribed and rendered into formal Arabic by the scribe Abū Ḥātim al-Balkhī for the Barmakid library.

Historical anecdotes record Mankah as a sharp, independent-minded philosopher. Ibn Abi Usaibia notes that while walking in the Khuld Palace, Mankah observed a street vendor claiming his medicinal paste could cure every single human illness. Mankah smiled and dryly remarked to his interpreter, "One way or the other, the king of the Arabs must be an ignorant man [to allow such claims]," highlighting his commitment to rational, moderate medical practices over charlatanism.

== Legacy ==
Mankah, along with contemporary Indian scholars in Baghdad like Ibn Dahn (Dhanpati) and Kankah (the astrologer), initiated the first major wave of the Abbasid translation movement, which predated the widespread translation of Greek texts. His translations of Indian pharmacology and toxicology deeply influenced later Islamic polymaths, including Al-Razi (Rhazes) and Ibn Sina (Avicenna), who integrated Ayurvedic principles into their own medical encyclopedias.

== See also ==
- Indian influence on Islamic science
