= Hayat Sindi =

Medical researcher

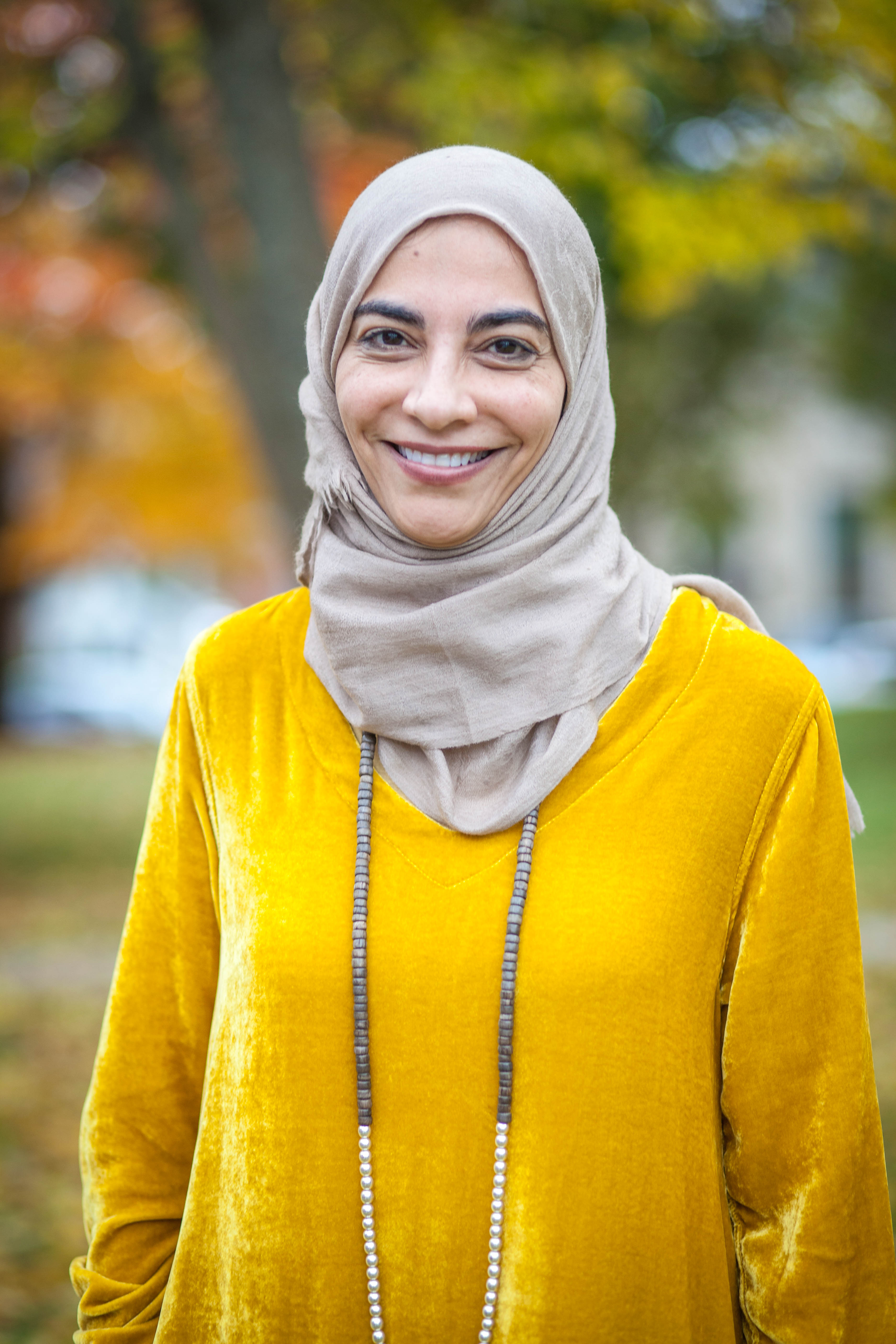
- Sindi in 2012
- Born: Hayat al-Sindi; 6 November 1967 (age 59); Mecca, Saudi Arabia
- Citizenship: (Saudi Arabia) Saudi Arabian
- Education: King's College London (BSc); Newnham College, Cambridge (PhD)
- Scientific career
- Fields: Medical research
- Thesis: Studies on a Novel Electromagnetic-Acoustic Sensor

Hayat Al Sindi (Arabic: حياة سندي; born 6 November 1967) is a Saudi Arabian biotechnologist and medical scientist who is one of the first female members of the Consultative Assembly of Saudi Arabia. She is famous for making major contributions to point-of-care medical testing and biotechnology. She was ranked by Arabian Business as the 19th most influential Arab in the world and the ninth most influential Arab woman. In 2018, she was listed as one of BBC's 100 Women.

== Early life and education ==
Born in Mecca, Saudi Arabia, Sindi remained in Saudi Arabia and did not learn English until she decided to relocate with the intention of attending a university. In 1991, she persuaded her family to allow her to pursue higher studies in England, where after a year spent learning English and studying for her A-levels, she was accepted to King's College London, where she graduated with a degree in pharmacology in 1995. While at King's College, she was a recipient of Princess Anne's Award for her undergraduate work on allergy. In 2001, Sindi became the first Saudi woman to obtain a PhD in Biotechnology from the University of Cambridge and then furthered her studies at MIT and Harvard.

Sindi, who wears the traditional Muslim headscarf, was pressured to abandon her religious and cultural beliefs while at university; she persisted, holding the view that a person's religion, color, or gender has no bearing on scientific contributions. Sindi went on to get a Ph.D. in biotechnology from Newnham College, Cambridge in 2001; she was the first Saudi woman to be accepted at Cambridge University in the field of biotechnology, and the first woman from any of the Arab States of the Persian Gulf to complete a doctoral degree in the field.

== Career ==
Hayat Sindi is a visiting scholar at Harvard University; as such, she travels often between Jeddah, Saudi Arabia and Boston and Cambridge, Massachusetts. Sindi's laboratory work at Harvard earned her a spot with four other scientists in a documentary film supported by the Executive Office of the President of the United States in order to promote science education among young people. Along with her scientific activities, Sindi participated in numerous events aimed at raising the awareness of science among women and girls, particularly in Saudi Arabia and the Muslim World in general. She is also interested in the problem of brain drain, and was an invited speaker at the Jeddah Economic Forum 2005.

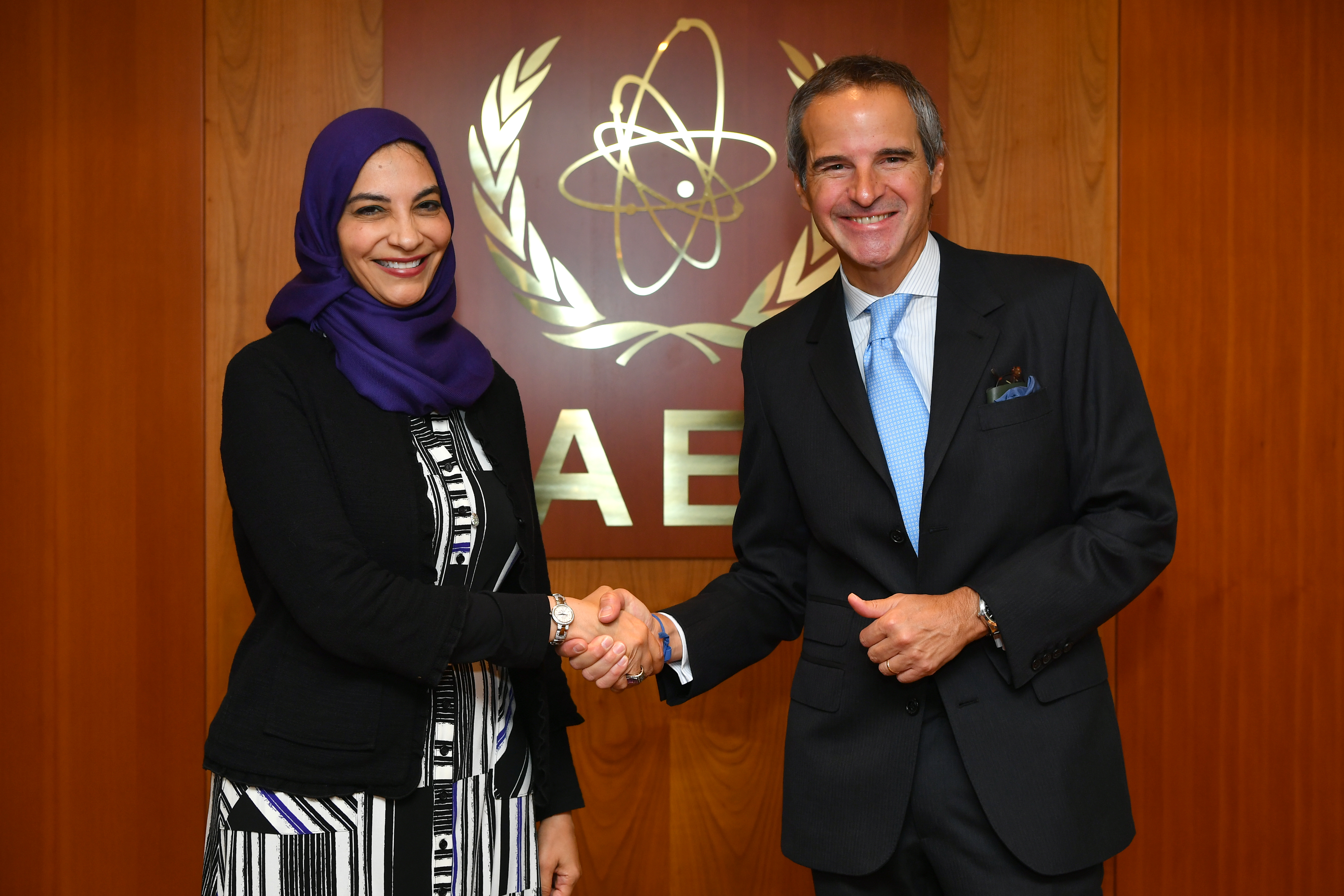
Sindi With Rafael Grossi.

Hayat Sindi was a major influence in starting three companies, either as cofounder or founder: Diagnostics for All (DFA), which aims to create low-cost devices that can be used in developing countries to diagnose diseases; Sonoptix; and i2 (the Institute for Imagination and Ingenuity), which promotes science education and innovation among younger generations. Her entrepreneurial philosophy is simple: "A true scientist should focus on affordable simple solutions to reach everyone in the world."

In 2010, Sindi was the winner of the Mekkah Al Mukaramah prize for scientific innovation, given by HRH Prince Khalid bin Faisal Al Saud. She was also named a 2011 Emerging Explorer by the National Geographic Society.

On 1 October 2012, Sindi was appointed by UNESCO head Irina Bokova as a UNESCO Goodwill Ambassador for her efforts in promoting science education in the Middle East, especially for girls. She was also on Newsweek's list of 150 women who shook the world for that year.

In January 2013, Sindi again broke new ground by becoming part of the first group of women to serve in Saudi Arabia's Consultative Council.

In 2013, she became the first Saudi and female scientist to be appointed as a UNESCO Goodwill Ambassador, fostering the integration of science and social impact. Additionally, she has presented her work in the House of Commons.

In the annual meeting of Clinton Global Initiative held on 21–24 September 2014, Sindi was awarded the Leadership in Civil Society prize.

In 2018, Sindi launched the IsDB's Transform Fund, which is worth $500 million. The fund supports innovators in finding solutions to development challenges through the power of innovation. It is the first digital hub of its kind for the developing world.

Sindi is a member of Saudi Arabia's Shura Council and the UN Scientific Advisory Board, and a senior advisor to the Islamic Development Bank's President of Science, Technology, and Innovation in Saudi Arabia. In an interview with UNESCO, Sindi said, "If anything, I would like to think that I have inspired girls to pursue a career in science if that is what interests them." In 2023, Sindi was elected an Honorary Fellow of Newnham College, Cambridge.

== See also ==
- Rufayda al-Aslamiyyah
- Al-Shifa' bint Abdullah
- Muslim women in science and technology
