= Abbas ibn Firnas =

9th-century astronomer and physician

- عباس ابن فرناس
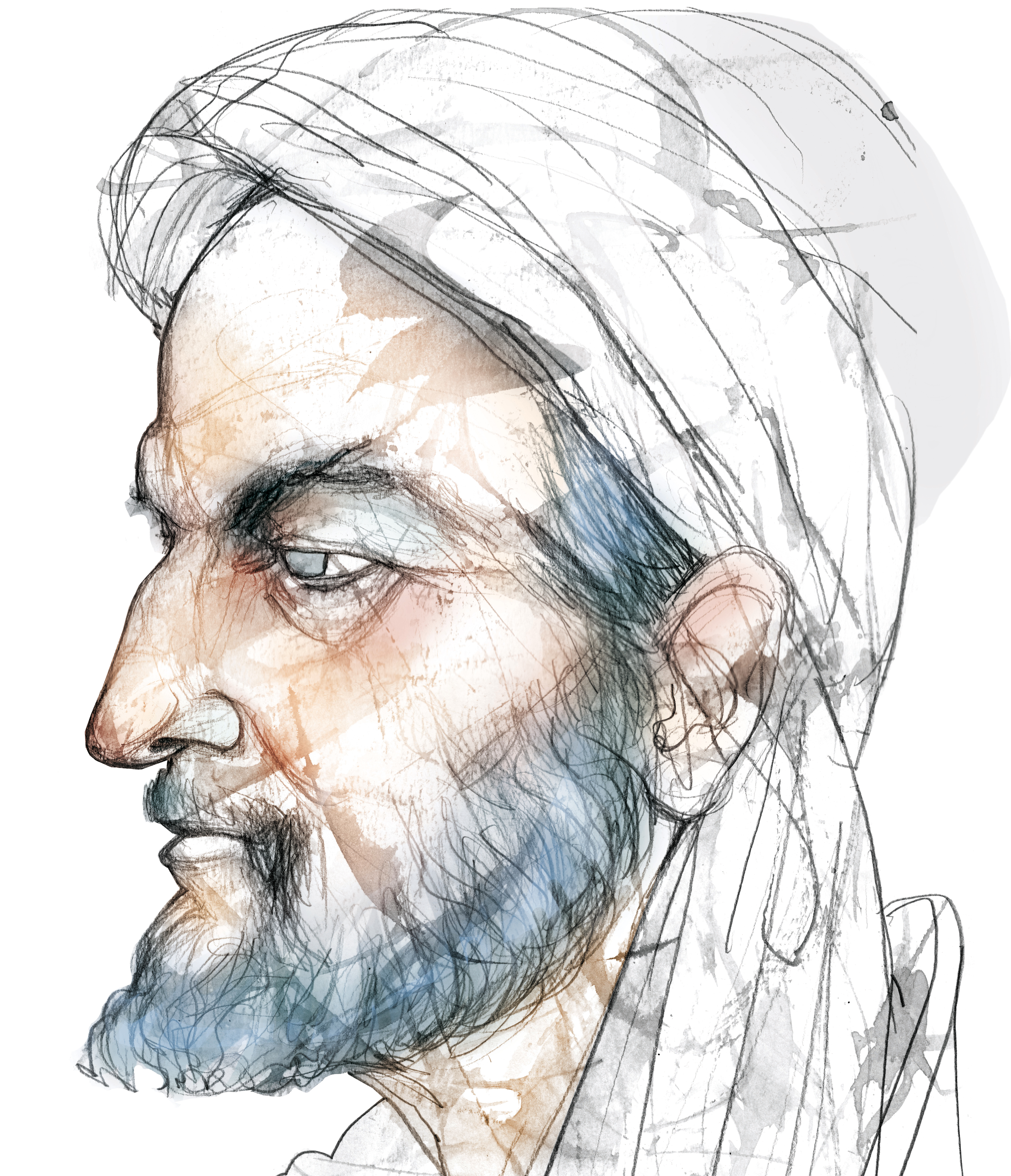
- 2011 artistic impression by Eulogia Merle
- Born: c. 810 CE; Ronda, Takurunna province, Emirate of Córdoba
- Died: 887 CE; Córdoba, Emirate of Córdoba
- Known for: Astronomy, engineering, medicine, invention

Abū al-Qāsim ʿAbbās ibn Firnās ibn Wardās al-Tākurunnī (Arabic: أَبُو ٱلْقَاسِمِ، عَبَّاسُ بْنُ فِرْنَاسِ بْنِ وَرْدَاسَ ٱلتَّاكُرُنِّيُّ; c. 809/810 – 887 CE), known as ʿAbbās ibn Firnās (Arabic: عَبَّاسُ بْنُ فِرْنَاسٍ) was an Andalusi polymath: an inventor, astronomer, physician, chemist, engineer, musician, and poet. He was reported to have experimented with unpowered flight.

Ibn Firnas made various contributions in the field of astronomy and engineering. He constructed a device which indicated the motion of the planets and stars in the Universe. In addition, Ibn Firnas came up with a procedure to manufacture colourless glass and made magnifying lenses for reading, which were known as reading stones.

== Early life ==
Scholarly consensus indicates that ibn Firnas (full name: Abu al-Qasim Abbas ibn Firnas ibn Wirdas al-Takurini) was: born in Ronda, Takurunna province; he lived in Córdoba, and, was an Umayyad mawlā (client) of Berber descent. His lineage may have been linked to the early Muslim conquests of the Iberian Peninsula. Later accounts emphasizing Arabic contributions to science may identify Abbas ibn Firnas in the broader frame of Islamic cultural heritage or as a muladí.

== Influence ==
Abbas ibn Firnas devised a means of manufacturing colourless glass. He invented various glass planispheres, and he made corrective lenses ("reading stones"). Abbas bin Firnas also devised an apparatus consisting of a chain of objects that could be used to simulate the motions of the planets and stars, and he developed a process for cutting rock crystal that enabled Al-Andalus to cease exporting quartz to Egypt to be cut. He introduced the Sindhind to Al-Andalus, which had important influence on astronomy in Europe. He also designed the al-Maqata, a water clock, and a prototype for a kind of metronome.

== Aviation ==
The earliest known account of Ibn Firnas's flight attempt appears in a unique manuscript of the Cordoban court chronicle al-Muqtabis II, attributed to the historian Ibn Hayyan (born 987/8), now preserved in the Royal Academy of History in Madrid. According to this account, Ibn Firnas covered himself in feathers fastened to silk and fitted himself with two wings, with which he rose into the air; he flew from the vicinity of Rusafa, circled, and landed far from his starting point, but injured his tailbone because he had not accounted for the way birds land on their tails. Anderson notes that the account was likely composed in the 10th century and compiled in the chronicle by Ibn Hayyan, although no secure date for the manuscript has been established. She argues that the reference to two wings, together with the description of rising and moving through the air, suggests a fixed-wing device, rather than one with flapping wings, capable of lift and a brief sustained glide. By contrast, Richard Hallion proposed that Ibn Firnas probably did not achieve true flight, but rather a kind of medieval parachute drop using a cloak.

Some seven centuries after the death of Firnas, the Algerian historian Ahmad al-Maqqari (d. 1632) wrote a description of Ibn Firnas that included the following:

Among other very curious experiments which he made, one is his trying to fly. He covered himself with feathers for the purpose, attached a couple of wings to his body, and, getting on an eminence, flung himself down into the air, when according to the testimony of several trustworthy writers who witnessed the performance, he flew a considerable distance, as if he had been a bird, but, in alighting again on the place whence he had started, his back was very much hurt, for not knowing that birds when they alight come down upon their tails, he forgot to provide himself with one.

Al-Maqqari's account is a late one and he does not cite his sources for the details of the reputed flight, though he claims that one verse in a ninth-century Arab poem is an allusion to it. The poem was written by the court poet Mu'min ibn Saïd, under Muhammad I (emir of the Emirate of Córdoba, d. 886), who was acquainted with (and usually critical of) Ibn Firnas. The pertinent verse runs: "He flew faster than the phoenix in his flight when he dressed his body in the feathers of a vulture." Writing in 1961, before the Madrid manuscript of Ibn Hayyan was published in facsimile, White concluded that no account independent of al-Maqqari had survived. Anderson observes that the earlier account differs from al-Maqqari's and from the 19th-century English rendering by Pascual de Gayangos, which has presented scholars with a puzzling description of the experiment.

It has been suggested that Ibn Firnas's attempt at glider flight might have inspired the attempt by Eilmer of Malmesbury between 1000 and 1010 in England; however, there exists no recorded evidence to support this hypothesis.

== Armen Firman ==
According to limited secondary sources, approximately 20 years before Ibn Firnas attempted to fly he witnessed a man named 'Armen Firman' wrap himself in a loose cloak stiffened with wooden struts and jump from a tower in Córdoba, intending to use the garment as wings on which he could glide. The alleged attempt at flight was unsuccessful, and the garment slowed his fall enough that he sustained only minor injuries.

However, secondary sources that deal exhaustively with Ibn Firnas's flight attempt make zero references to 'Armen Firman'. Al-Maqqari's account of Ibn Firnas – the sole primary source of the flight story – makes no mention of 'Firman'. Because 'Firman's' jump is said to have been Ibn Firnas's source of inspiration, the lack of any mention of 'Firman' in Al-Maqqari's account may point to synthesis — the tower jump later confused with Ibn Firnas's gliding attempt in secondary writings.

It is likely that 'Armen Firman' is, in fact, the Latinized name of Abbas ibn Firnas.

== Legacy ==
In 1973, a statue of Ibn Firnas by the sculptor Badri al-Samarrai was installed at the Baghdad International Airport, in Iraq. In 1976, the International Astronomical Union (IAU) approved the naming of a crater on the moon after Ibn Firas: the lunar impact crater, Ibn Firnas. In Córdoba, the Abbas ibn Firnás Bridge was named in his honour (the bridge's construction was completed in 2011). Firnas Airways, a British one-plane airline, was also named after him.

== See also ==
- Hezârfen Ahmed Çelebi
- History of aviation
- Ismail ibn Hammad al-Jawhari
- Lagâri Hasan Çelebi
- List of inventions in the medieval Islamic world
- Timeline of science and technology in the Islamic world

== Sources ==
- J. Vernet, Abbas Ibn Firnas. Dictionary of Scientific Biography (C.C. Gilespie, ed.) Vol. I, New York: Charles Scribner's Sons, 1970–1980. pg. 5.
- Lynn Townsend White Jr. (Spring, 1961). "Eilmer of Malmesbury, an Eleventh Century Aviator: A Case Study of Technological Innovation, Its Context and Tradition", Technology and Culture 2 (2), p. 97–111 [100f.], doi:10.2307/3101411.
- Salim T.S. Al-Hassani (ed.), Elisabeth Woodcock (au.), and Rabah Saoud (au.). 2006. 1001 Inventions. Muslim Heritage in Our World. Manchester: Foundation for Science, Technology and Civilisation. See pages 308–313. (ISBN 978-0-9555035-0-4)
