= Muḥammad ibn Ibrāhīm al-Fazārī =

8/9th century Arab mathematician and astronomer

Muhammad ibn Ibrahim al-Fazari
- Died: 796 or 806 possibly Baghdad
- Occupations: Philosopher, mathematician, astronomer
- Era: Islamic Golden Age

Muhammad ibn Ibrahim ibn Habib ibn Sulayman ibn Samra ibn Jundab al-Fazari (Arabic: محمد بن إبراهيم بن حبيب بن سليمان بن سمرة بن جندب الفزاري) (died 796 or 806) was an Arab philosopher, mathematician and astronomer.

== Biography ==
Al-Fazārī translated many scientific books into Arabic and Persian. He is credited to have built the first astrolabe in the Islamic world. He died in 796 or 806, possibly in Baghdad.

At the end of the 8th century, whilst at the court of the Abbasid Caliphate, al-Fazārī mentioned Ghana, "the land of gold."

== Works ==
On the order of caliph Mansur al-Fazārī along with Yaʿqūb ibn Ṭāriq, al-Fazārī helped translate the 7th century Indian astronomical text by Brahmagupta, the Brāhmasphuṭasiddhānta, into Arabic as 'Zij as-Sindhind Az-Zīj ‛alā Sinī al-‛Arab, or the Sindhind which was completed in Baghdad about 750. This translation was possibly the vehicle by means of which the mathematical methods of Indian astronomers and the Hindu numeral system (the modern number notation) were transmitted to Islam.

Al-Fazari also composed various astronomical writings: "On the astrolabe", "On the armillary spheres", "On the calendar".

== See also ==
- Al-Fazari
- Samura ibn Jundab al-Fazārī
- Indian influence on Islamic science

== Sources ==
- van Bladel, Kevin (2015). "Eighth-Century Indian Astronomy in the Two Cities of Peace". In Sadeghi, Behnam; Ahmed, Asad Q.; Silverstein, Adam J.; Hoyland, Robert G. (eds.). Islamic Cultures, Islamic Contexts Essays In Honor Of Professor Patricia Crone. Leiden: Brill. ISBN 978-90042-5-201-1.
- Frye, Richard N. (2000). The Golden Age of Persia. London: Phoenix Press. ISBN 1842120115.
- Kennedy, Edward Stewart (1956). "A Survey of Islamic Astronomical Tables". Transactions of the American Philosophical Society. New Series. 46 (2). Philadelphia: American Philosophical Society: 123–177. doi:10.2307/1005726. hdl:2027/mdp.39076006359272. ISSN 0065-9746. JSTOR 1005726.
- Levtzion, Nehemia (1973). Ancient Ghana and Mali. New York: Methuen & Co Ltd. ISBN 0841904316.
- Montgomery, Scott L. (2000). Science in Translation: Movements of Knowledge through Cultures and Time. Chicago: University of Chicago Press. ISBN 978-02265-3-481-7.
- Samsó, Julio (2016). "al-Fazārī". Encyclopedia of Islam (3rd ed.). pp. 91–93 – via Academia.
- Sarton, George (1962). Introduction to the History of Science. Vol. 1. Baltimore, Maryland: Published for the Carnegie Institution of Washington, by the Williams & Wilkins Co. OCLC 1157182492.
- Suter, Heinrich (1900). Die Mathematiker und Astronomen der Araber und ihre Werke (in German). Leipzig: Teubner. OCLC 230703086.
