= Carlo Fazzari =

Italian rugby union player

- Born: 7 April 1990 (age 36) Brescia, Italy
- Height: 1.90 m (6 ft 3 in)
- Weight: 115 kg (254 lb)

Rugby union career
- Position: Prop
Senior career
Years	Team	Apps	(Points)
2009-2010	Parma	10	(0)
2010-2011	Petrarca	23	(5)
2011-2012	Treviso	4	(0)
2012-2014	Zebre	12	(0)
2014	→Petrarca	9	(5)
- Correct as of 10 May 2014

Carlo Fazzari (born 7 April 1990) is a former Italian rugby union player who played as a prop.

He played for Zebre in the Pro12, from 2012/13 to 2013/14. He currently plays for Petrarca Padova Rugby.

He played as prop for several Italian Teams, winning the national league in 2011.

Owner of several clinics in his hometown Brescia. CEO of Brain Stimulation Italia, organization that provide neurostimulation treatments for mental health issues.
