= Muslim women in science and technology =

Since the Islamic Golden Age, Muslims, including women, have been actively participating in various sciences. Despite being involved in politics throughout Islamic history, women have experienced—and still continue to experience—gender-based discrimination in many Muslim countries because of the belief that certain discriminatory practices have a basis in Islam even though the Quran, hadiths, and sunnah advocate for the equal rights of men and women to seek knowledge.

== Individuals ==
=== Rufayda al-Aslamiyyah ===
Also known as the first nurse in Islamic history, Rufayda al-Aslamiyyah led a team of volunteer nurses in the battles of Badr, Uhud, Ditch, Khaybar, and other conflicts to take care of the wounded and dying. She further played a role in the development of the first mobile medical units to satisfy the requirements of the community for medical care. Through assisting her father, Saad Al-Aslamy, Rufayda learnt most of her knowledge. She became a healer after devoting her time to nursing and taking care of the ill. She used to practice her skills in her tent during the battles. Muhammad used to demand that all casualties be sent to her tent as she had high expertise in the field.

The Aga Khan University named the College of Nursing and Midwifery after her in honour of her service. The Rufaida Al Aslamiya Award is given annually by the University of Bahrain to exceptional nurses.

=== Al-Shifa bint Abdullah ===
Al-Shifa bint Abdulla worked in public administration and trained in medicine. She was the first Muslim woman to teach traditional medical practices. Although her name was Laila, she was given the name Al-Shifa (Arabic for "the healing") because of her profession as a nurse. Her method to treat patients was to use a preventative treatment against ant bites. Her method received approval from Muhammad, and she was requested to train other women.

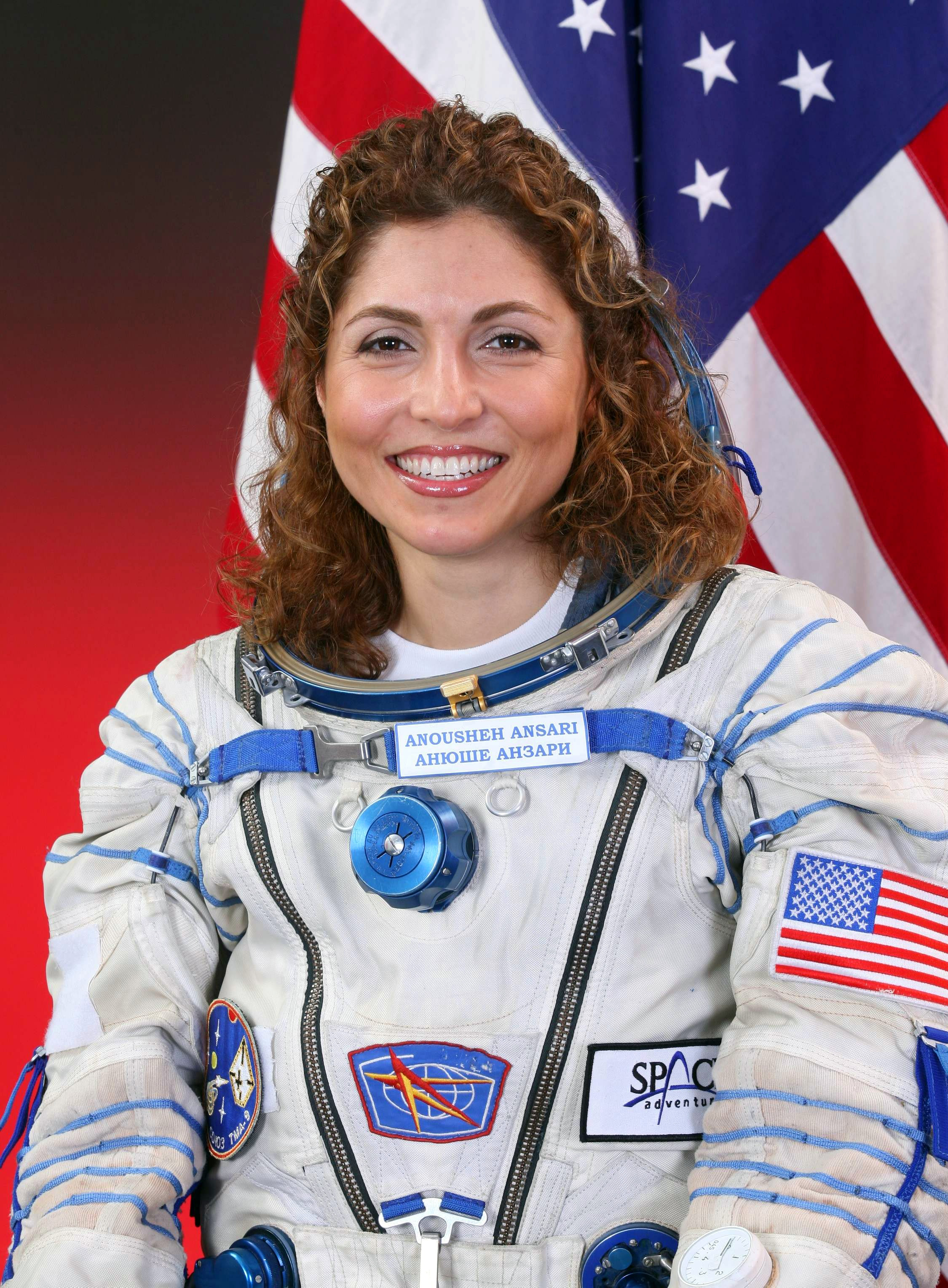
Anousheh Ansari

=== Anousheh Ansari ===
On September 18, 2006, Anousheh Ansari became the first female private space explorer at 40 years of age. She was launched off from Kazakhstan in a Russian Soyuz spacecraft She migrated from Iran to America when she was about 17, in 1984. In 1993, her husband Hamid Ansari and brother-in-law Amir Ansari worked together and funded a company called Telecom Technologies Inc. Ansari received her bachelor's degree in computer and electronic engineering from George Mason University, Fairfax, Virginia. Soon after, she completed her masters' degree in Washington, D.C., at George Washington University. Anousheh spoke several different languages, such as Persian, French, English, and Russian - which she learned for her spaceflight.

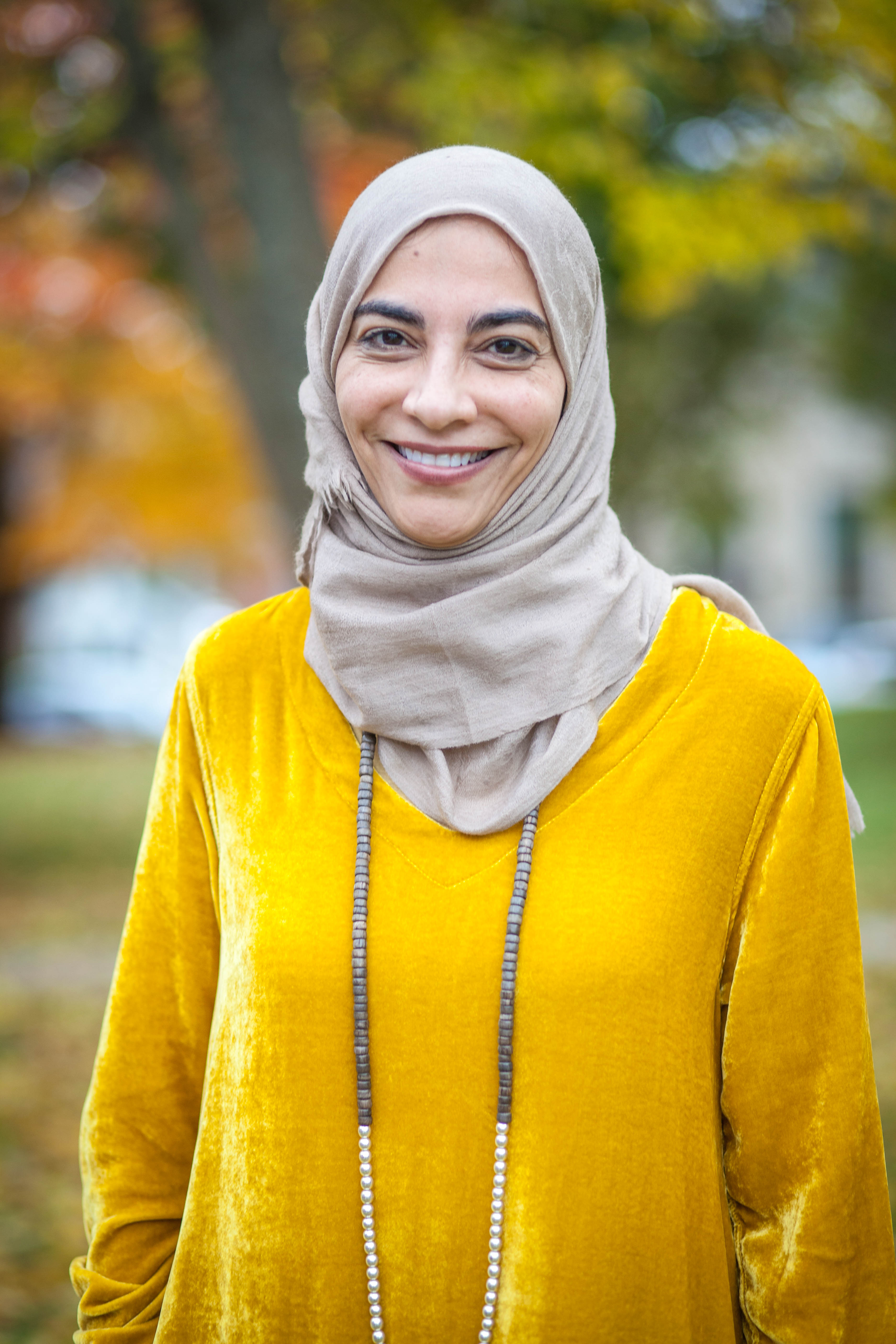
Hayat Sindi

=== Hayat Al Sindi ===
Hayat Al Sindi is a medical scientist in Saudi Arabia. She is also the first female among the Consultative Assembly of Saudi Arabia's members. Her contributions were extremely good for biotechnology as well as medical testing. "My mission is to find simple, inexpensive ways to monitor health that are specifically designed for remote places and harsh conditions" Her test devices were ensured to not require external power or electricity. Sindi never spoke English or even traveled outside of Saudi Arabia, but she ended up moving to England to attend a university. After learning English, she applied to Cambridge University for biotechnology and was the first female to be accepted into it.

=== Lubna of Córdoba ===
Lubna of Córdoba was originally a slave-girl of Spanish origin, she rose to become an important figure in the Umayyad Palace of Cordoba.

=== Sutayta al-Mahamali ===
She came from a highly educated Baghdadi family (her father, Abu ‘Abdullah al-Hussein, was a judge and the author of several books on Islamic jurisprudence). Sutayta, however, excelled in mathematics; proving good at hisab (arithmetic) and fara'idh (successoral calculations).

=== Maryam al-Astrulabi ===
Ibn al-Nadim (d. 998), the famous Muslim biographer and scholar, speaks of a woman named Al-'Ijiliya in his work al-Fihrist, claiming that she was amongst the pupils of Bitolus, a well-known tenth-century astrolabe maker who lived in Baghdad.41 Her full name was Maryam al-Astrulabi (d.967) and she was the daughter of a famous astrolabe maker, al-‘Ijili al-Astrulabi, who lived in Aleppo and had likewise been a pupil of Bitolus. Maryam al-‘Ijiliya’s hand-crafted astrolabe designs were so intricate and innovative that, from 944 to 967, she was employed at the court of Sayf al-Dawlah, a powerful Hamdanid ruler based in northern Syria.

=== Gevher Nesibe Sultan ===
In the early thirteenth century, Gevher Nesibe Sultan (d. 1206), the daughter of Kilij Arslan II of the Rum Sultanate, endowed a magnificent complex comprising a hospital, an adjoining madrasah devoted to medical studies, and a mosque. Located in Kayseri, Turkey, this complex is considered a pre-eminent example of Seljuk architecture and is still named after the princess – the Gevher Nesibe kulliyesi (complex).

=== Fatima al-Fihri ===
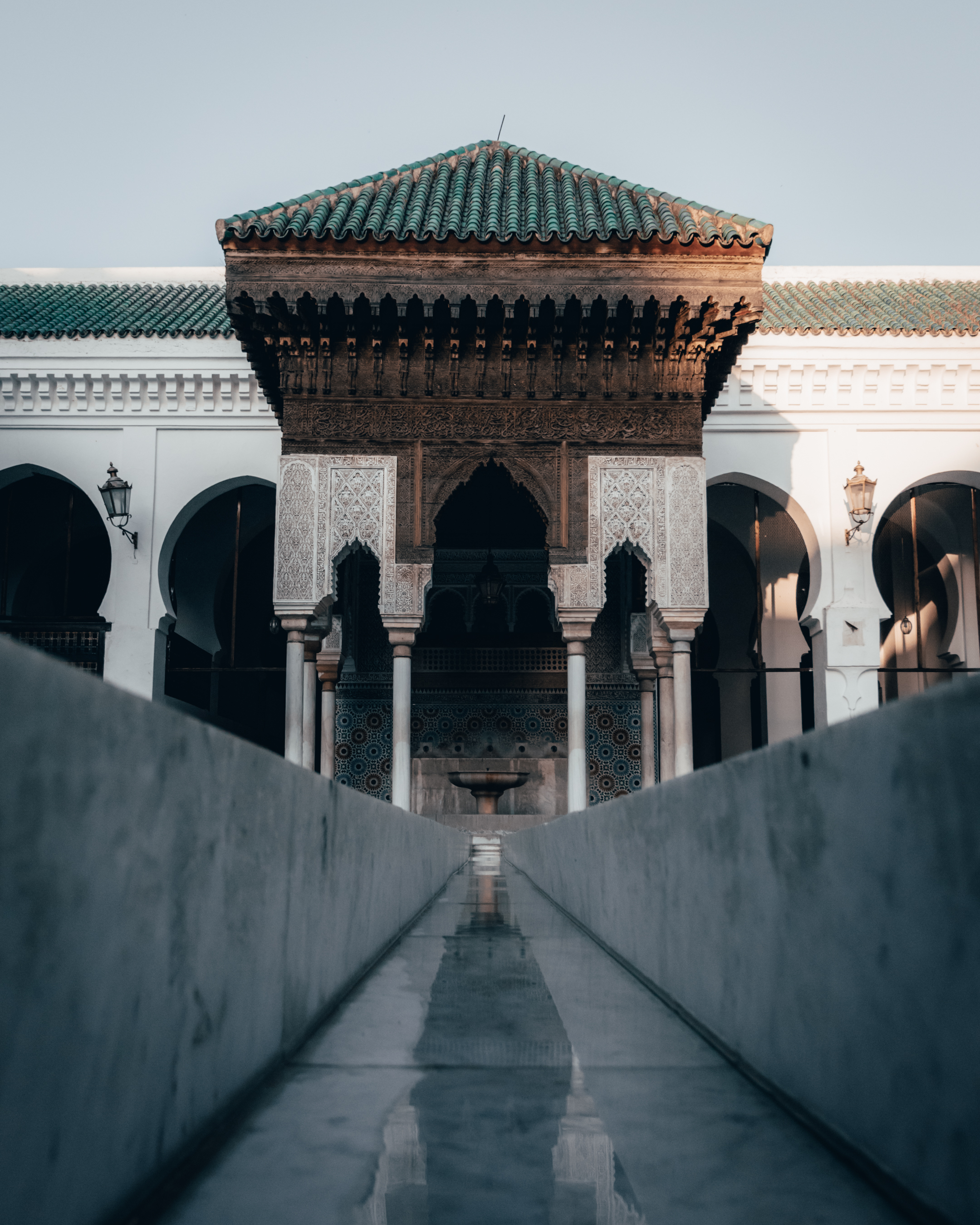
Al Qarawiyyin courtyard in 2019

The grand college mosque complex of al-Qarawiyin in Fez - potentially the oldest University in the world - was originally established in 841 by Fatima al-Fihriya. A young woman from Kiroan (Tunisia), Fatima inherited a large sum of money from her father and decided to use it in order to give Fez a centre of learning. She vowed to spend her entire inheritance on this dream and al-Qarawiyin developed into a centre of religious instruction and political discussion, gradually extending its curriculum to cover all subjects, particularly the natural sciences (therefore earning its name as one of the first universities). At its height, al-Qarawiyin was well-equipped with astronomical instruments, while its ‘timers room’ had astrolabes, sand clocks and other instruments for calculating time. Its variety of subjects and teaching drew scholars and students from far and wide, contributing greatly to the flourishing of Islamic civilisation.

=== Fatima al-Majriti (c. 10th century) ===
Thought to have been an astronomer from Andalusia, and daughter of astronomer and mathematician Maslama al-Majriti. There is much debate surrounding the historical accuracy of the figure of Fatima al-Majriti.

=== Al-Hakam’s Astronomer (c. 10th century) ===
She was an astronomer who worked in the palace of the Andalusian Caliph Al-Hakam al-Mustansir Billah (r. 961–976).

=== Maryam al-Zenatiyyah (d. 1356) ===
Skillful in the science of chemistry and poetry. She was from the famous Zenat Berber Amazighi tribe of Qairawan.

=== Dahma bint Yahya ibn al-Murtadha (d. 1434) ===
Zaidi scholar resided in the city of Thila in Yemen, where she taught jurisprudence. She was also proficient in various sciences, excelling in grammar, usool, logic, astronomy, chemistry, and poetry.

=== Abu ‘Abdullah al-Kinani’s assistant (d. 11th century) ===
She was proficient in medicine, natural science and the knowledge of anatomy amongst other sciences.

== Organizations ==
=== International Forum on Women in Science and Technology in Muslim Countries ===
The International Forum on Women in Science and Technology in Muslim Countries was held by the United Nations regarding the changes women have brought in the sciences in Muslim countries.

=== International Society of Muslim Women in Science ===
Established in 2010, the International Society of Muslim Women in Science (ISMWS) currently has 300 members from 31 countries. It operates in various fields such as networking, collaborating, linking institutions across borders, and highlighting in women for contributing to science.

== See also ==
- Women in Islam
