= Ya'qub ibn Tariq =

8th century Persian astrologer

Yaʿqūb ibn Ṭāriq
- یعقوب ابن طارق
- Born: fl. 8th century
- Died: c. 796

Academic work
- Era: Islamic Golden Age
- Main interests: Astronomer and mathematician

Yaʿqūb ibn Ṭāriq (Persian: یعقوب ابن طارق; referred to by some sources as Yaʿqūb; died c. 796) was a Persian astronomer and mathematician who lived in Baghdad.

== Career ==
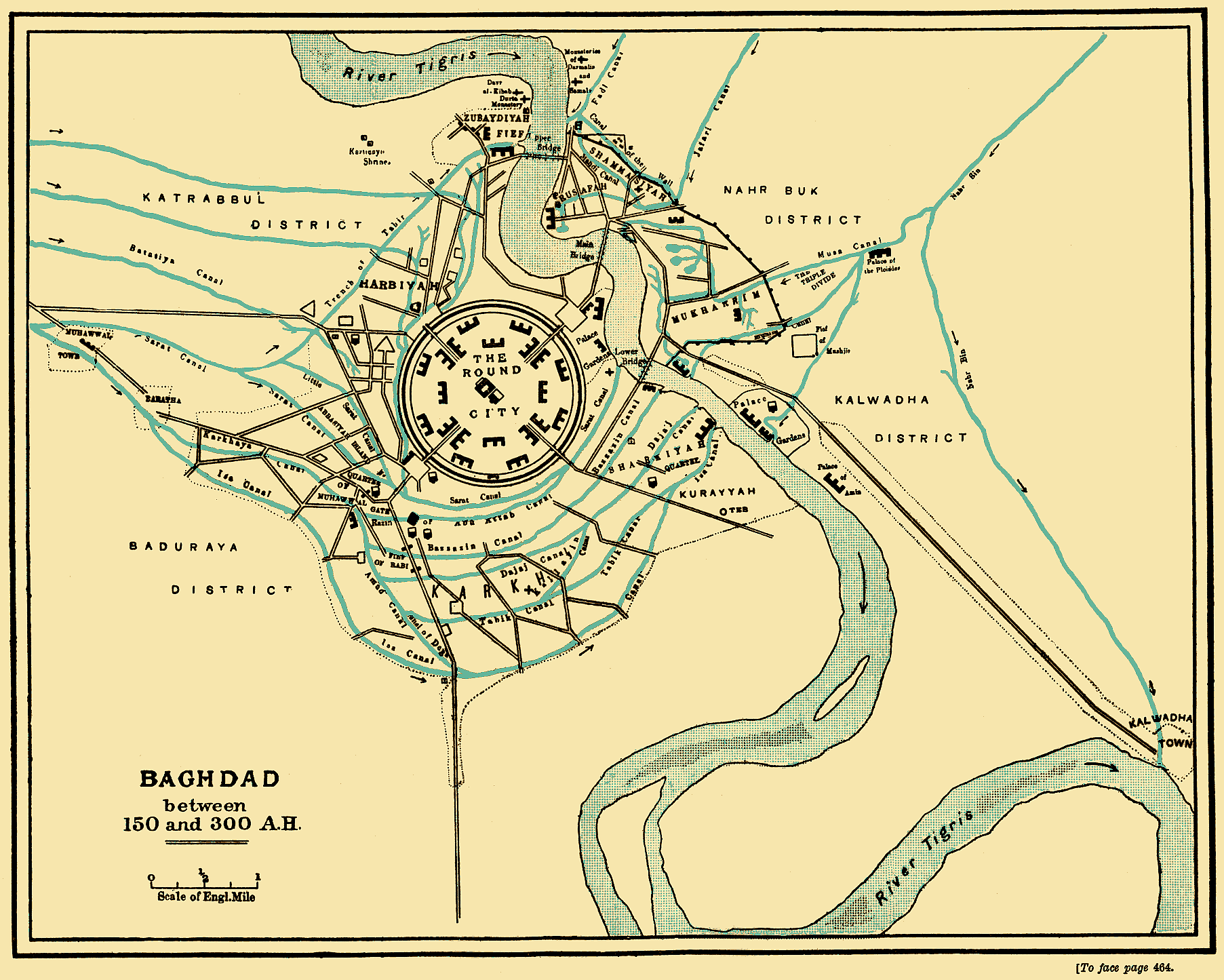
William Muir's depiction of the original round city of Baghdad (1883), where Yaʿqūb ibn Ṭāriq was active during his career

Yaʿqūb ibn Ṭāriq was active in Baghdad as an astronomer during the rule of the second Abbasid caliph, al-Manṣūr (r. 754–775). He seems not to have been aware of Ptolemaic astronomy, and used a Zoroastrian calendar, which consisted of 12 months of 30 days each, with any remaining days being added after the eighth month, Ābān.

Yaʿqūb ibn Ṭāriq's treatise Tarkīb al‐aflāk dealt with cosmography (the placement and sizes of the heavenly bodies). The estimations of their sizes and distances in Tarkīb al‐aflāk were tabulated in the 11th century by the polymath al-Bīrūnī, in his work on India. According to al-Bīrūnī, Yaʿqūb ibn Ṭāriq gave the radius of the Earth as 1,050 farsakhs, the diameter of the Moon and Mercury as 5,000 farsakhs (4.8 Earth radii), and the diameter of the other heavenly bodies (Venus, the Sun, Mars, Jupiter, and Saturn) as 20,000 farsakhs (19.0 Earth radii). He wrote that each of the planets had six associated spheres, that the Sun possessed two spheres, and the Moon three. He also spoke of planetary epicycles and speeds. His values for the longitudes and apogees of celestial objects originated from a Persian set of astronomical tables, the Zīǧ aš-šāh written by Yazdegerd III, although he used methods originating from the work of Indian astronomers to calculate the lunar phases.

The Christian astrologer Ibn Hibintā mentioned Yaʿqūb, noting that he used the positions of the Sun and the stars to determine the latitude of places.

== Works ==
Works ascribed to Yaʿqūb ibn Ṭāriq include:

- Zīj maḥlūl fī al‐Sindhind li‐daraja daraja ("Astronomical Tables in the 'Sindhind' Resolved for each Degree");
- Tarkīb al‐aflāk ("Arrangement of the Orbs"). Part of this work, the earliest surviving description of the celestial sky by an Islamic astronomer, is preserved by Ibn Hibintā.
- Kitāb al‐ʿilal ("Rationales");
- Taqṭīʿ kardajāt al‐jayb ("Distribution of the Kardajas of the Sine");
- Mā irtafaʿa min qaws niṣf al‐nahār ("Elevation along the Arc of the Meridian").

An astrological work, Al‐maqālāt ("The Chapters"), is ascribed to Yaʿqūb ibn Ṭāriq by an unreliable source.

Yaʿqūb ibn Ṭāriq's zij, written in around 770, was based on a Sanskrit work, thought to be similar to the Brāhmasphuṭasiddhānta. It was brought to the court of al-Mansūr, the third caliph of the Fatimid Caliphate, from Sindh, reportedly by the Sindhi astronomer Kankah.

== Sources ==
- Kennedy, Edward Stewart (1956). "A Survey of Islamic Astronomical Tables". Transactions of the American Philosophical Society. New Series. 46 (2). Philadelphia, Pennsylvania: American Philosophical Society: 123–177. doi:10.2307/1005726. hdl:2027/mdp.39076006359272. ISSN 0065-9746. JSTOR 1005726.
- Pingree, David (1976). "Yaʿqūb ibn Ṭāriq". In Gillispie, Charles Coulston (ed.). Dictionary of Scientific Biography. Vol. 14. New York: Charles Scribner's Sons. ISBN 978-0-684-16962-0.
- Plofker, Kim (2007). "Yaʿqūb ibn Ṭāriq". In Thomas Hockey; et al. (eds.). The Biographical Encyclopedia of Astronomers. New York: Springer. ISBN 978-0-387-31022-0. (PDF version)
- Sezgin, Fuat (2021). "III. Arab Astronomers". Sezgin Online. doi:10.1163/2667-3975_SEZO_COM_603.
