= Zij as-Sindhind =

Translated astronomy text

Zīj as-Sindhind (Arabic: زيج السندهند الكبير, Zīj as‐Sindhind al‐Kabīr, lit. "Great Astronomical Tables of the Sindhind"; from Sanskrit siddhānta, "system" or "treatise") is a work of zij (astronomical handbook with tables used to calculate celestial positions) brought in the early 770s AD to the court of Caliph al-Mansur in Baghdad from India. Al-Mansur requested an Arabic translation, from the Sanskrit, of Brahmagupta's Brāhmasphuṭasiddhānta. The 8th-century astronomer and translator Muḥammad ibn Ibrāhīm al-Fazārī is known to have contributed to this translation. In his book Ṭabaqāt al-ʼUmam "Categories of Nations", Said al-Andalusi informs that others who worked on it include ibn Sa'd and Muhammad ibn Musa al-Khwarizmi. He adds that its meaning is al-dahr al-dahir (infinite time or cyclic time).

== Content ==
This is the first of many Arabic zijs based on the Indian astronomical methods known as the Sindhind. The work contains tables for the movements of the sun, the moon and the five planets known at the time. It consists of approximately 37 chapters on calendar and astronomical calculations and 116 tables with calendar, astronomical and astrological data, as well as a table of sine values.

As described by Said al-Andalusi, as-Sindhind divides time into cyclic periods of creation and destruction which are called kalpas.

== Sources ==
- Andalusī, Ṣāʻid ibn Aḥmad; Salem, Semaʻan I.; Kumar, Alok (1991). Science in the Medieval World: Book of the Categories of Nations. Austin, Texas: University of Texas Press. ISBN 0292704690.
- Plofker, Kim (2007). "Fazārī: Muḥammad ibn Ibrāhīm al‐Fazārī". In Thomas Hockey; et al. (eds.). The Biographical Encyclopedia of Astronomers. New York: Springer. pp. 362–3. ISBN 978-0-387-31022-0. (PDF version)
