= Timurid Renaissance =

14th–16th-century Asian cultural movement

- Date: 14th century – 16th century
- Location: Timurid Empire (Central Asia and Persia)
- Participants: Timurid dynasty Gunpowder Empires: Mughal Empire; Ottoman Empire; Safavid Empire

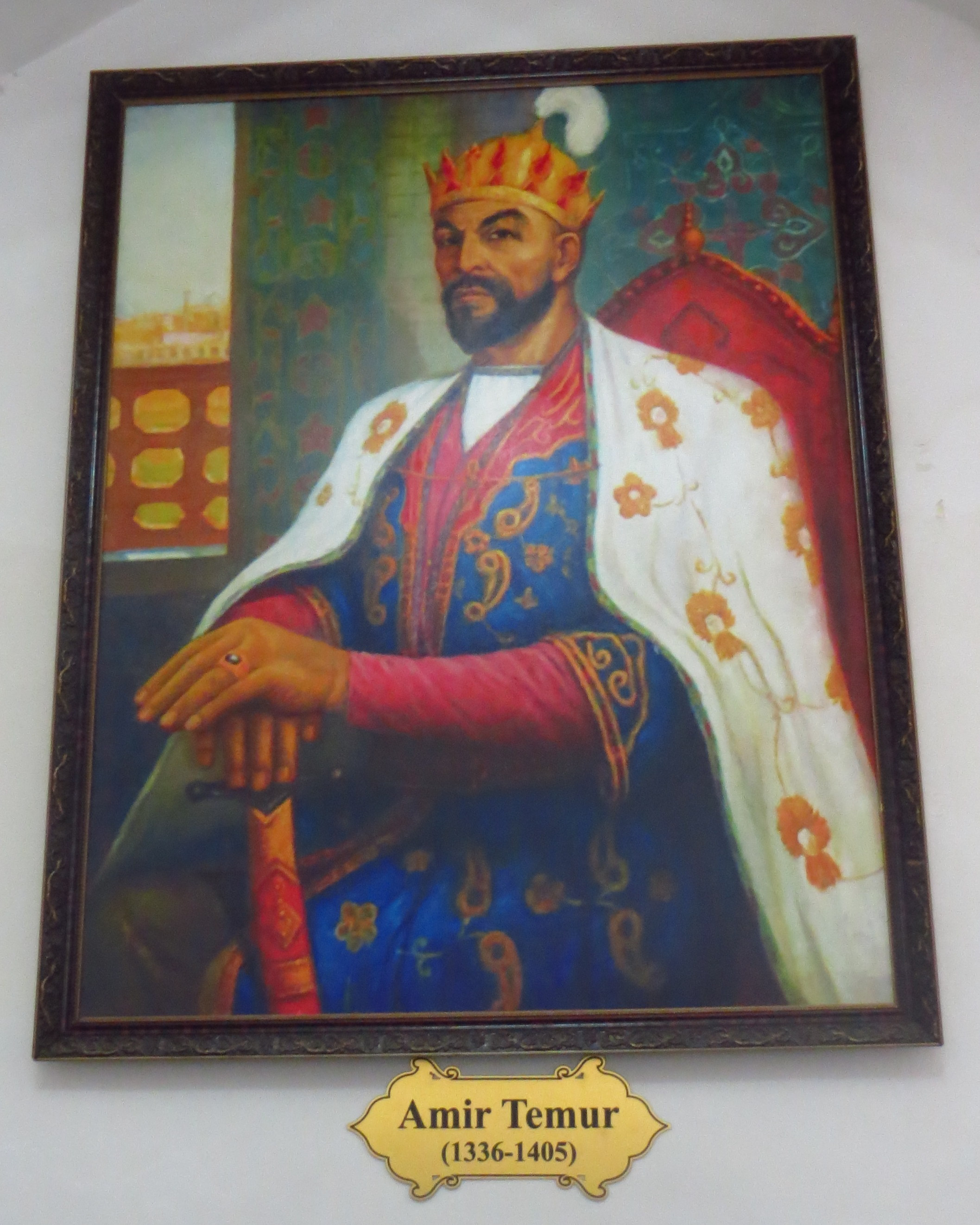
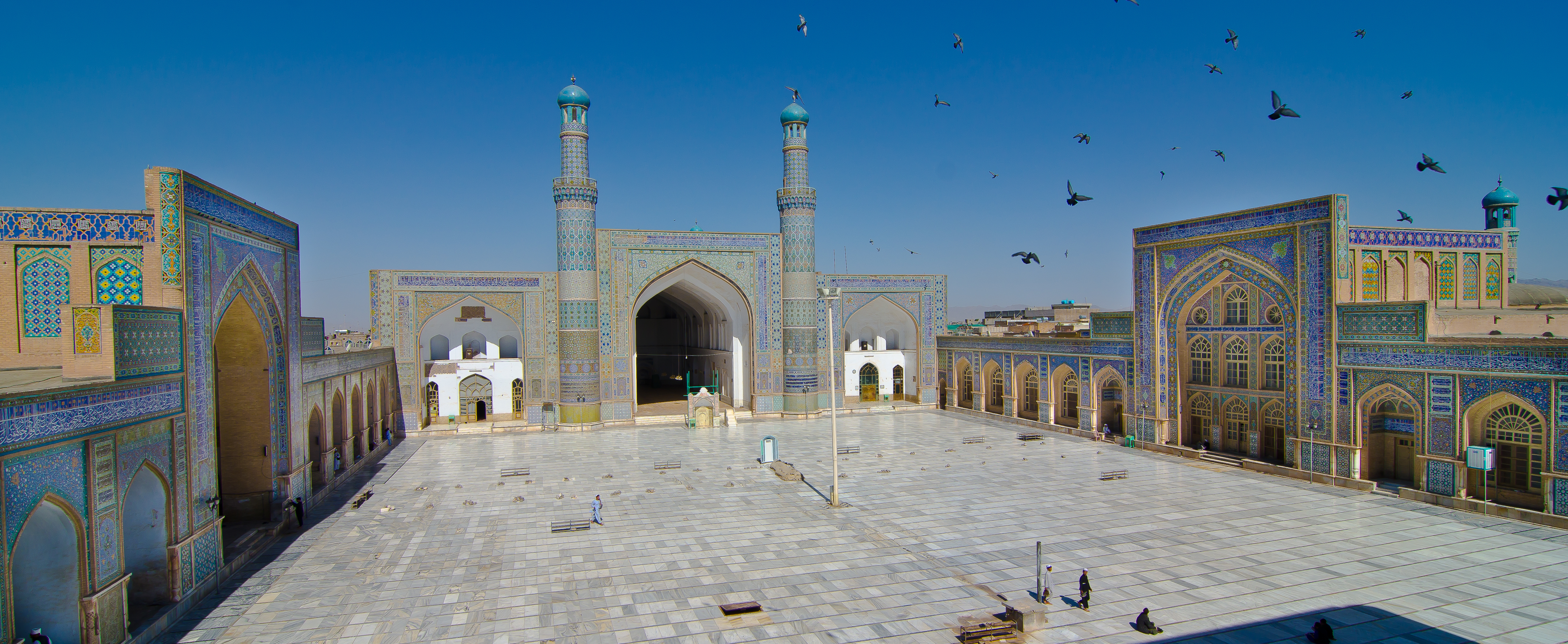
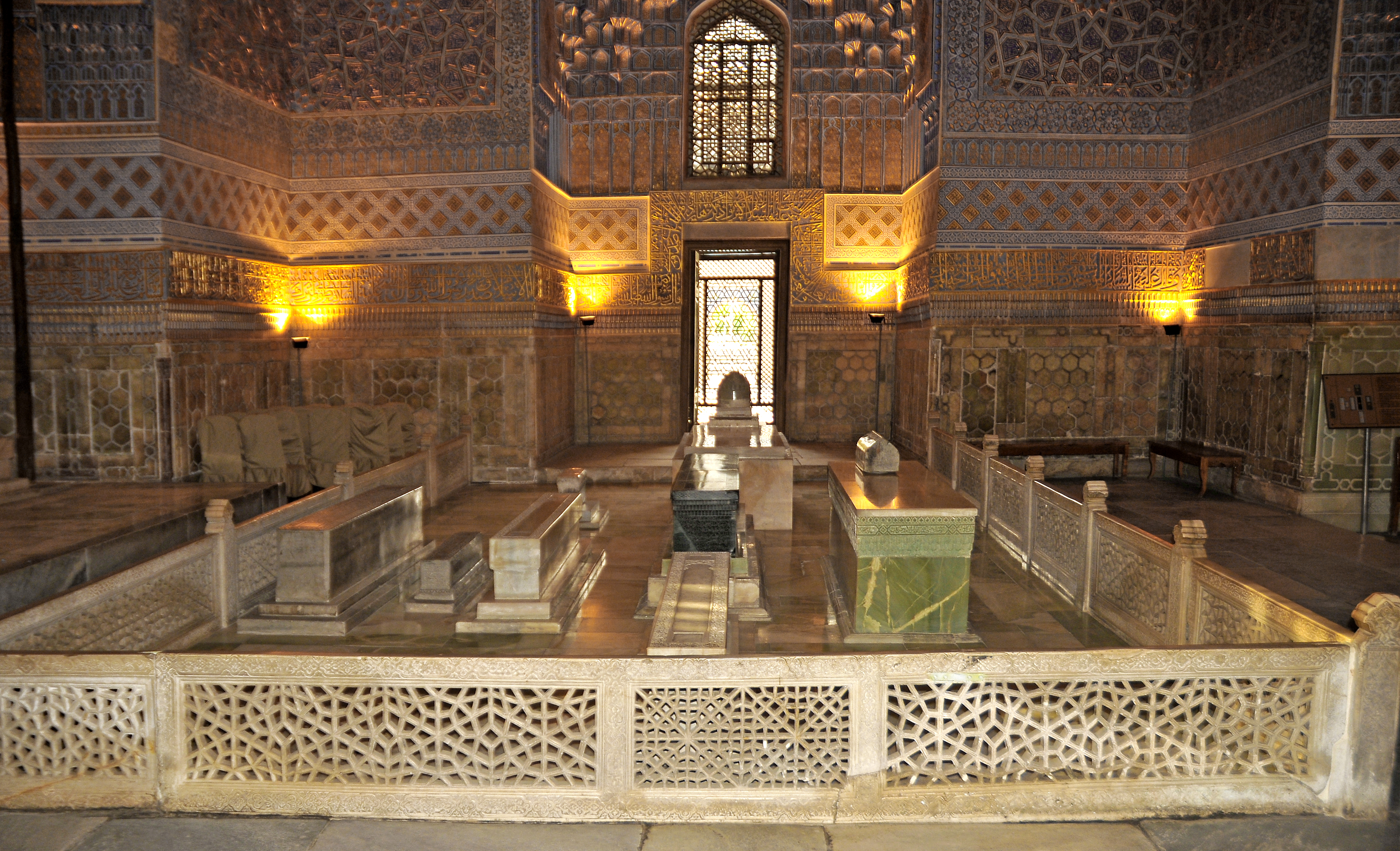
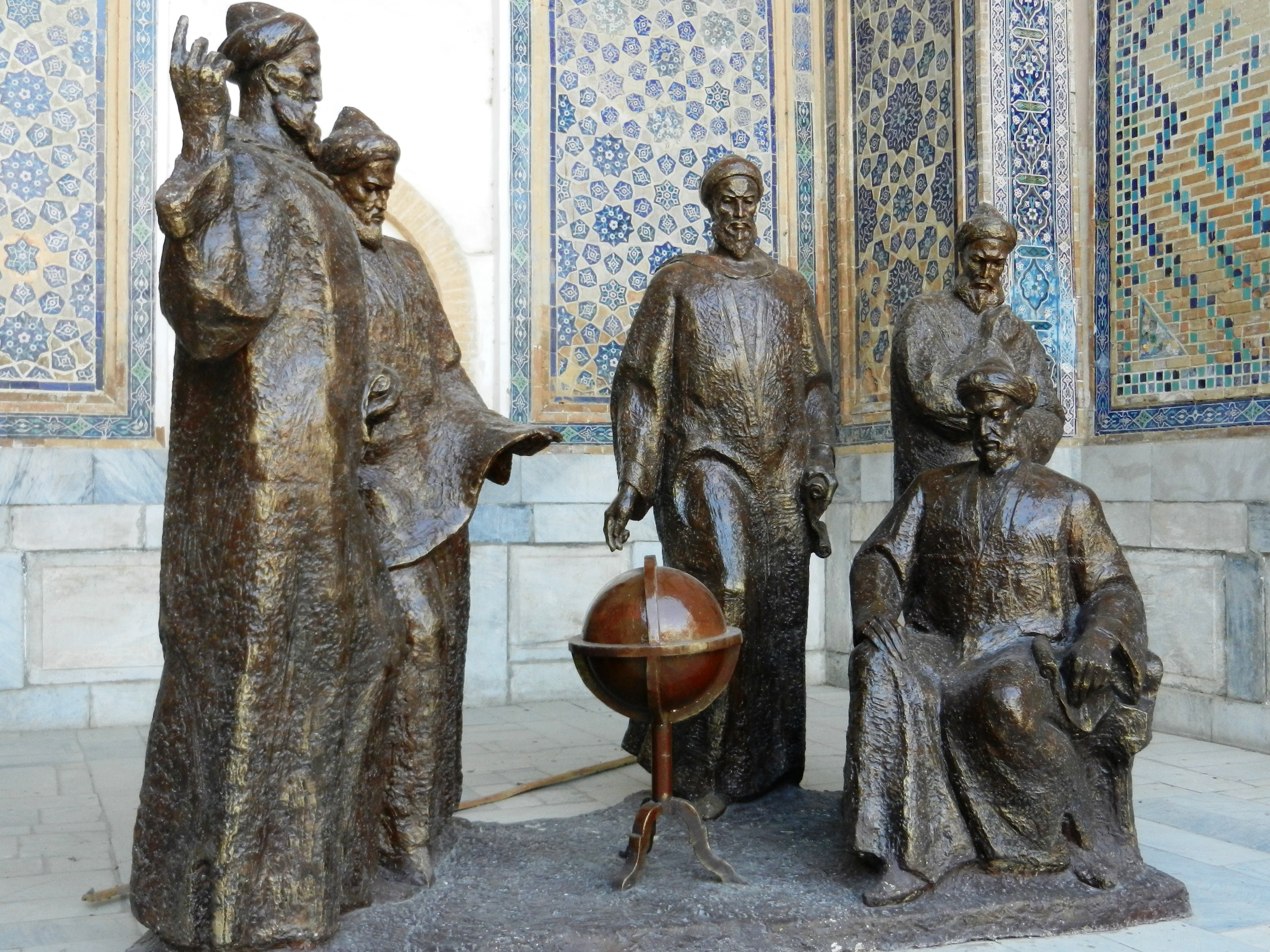
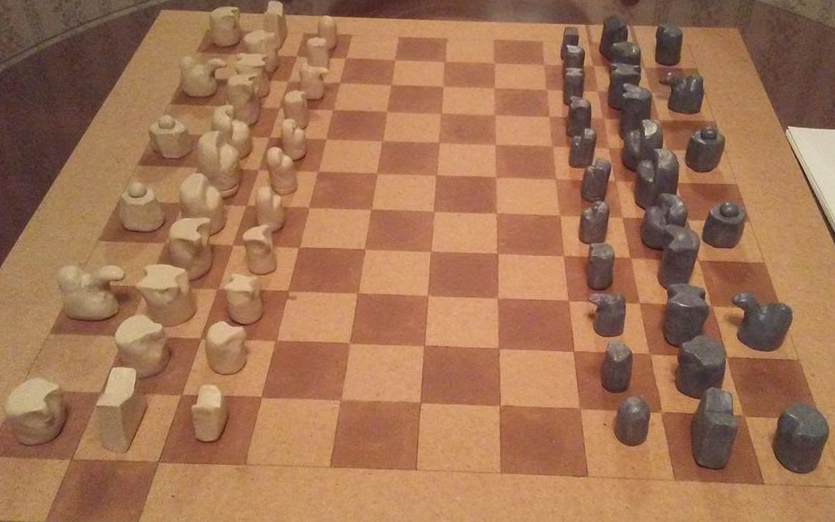
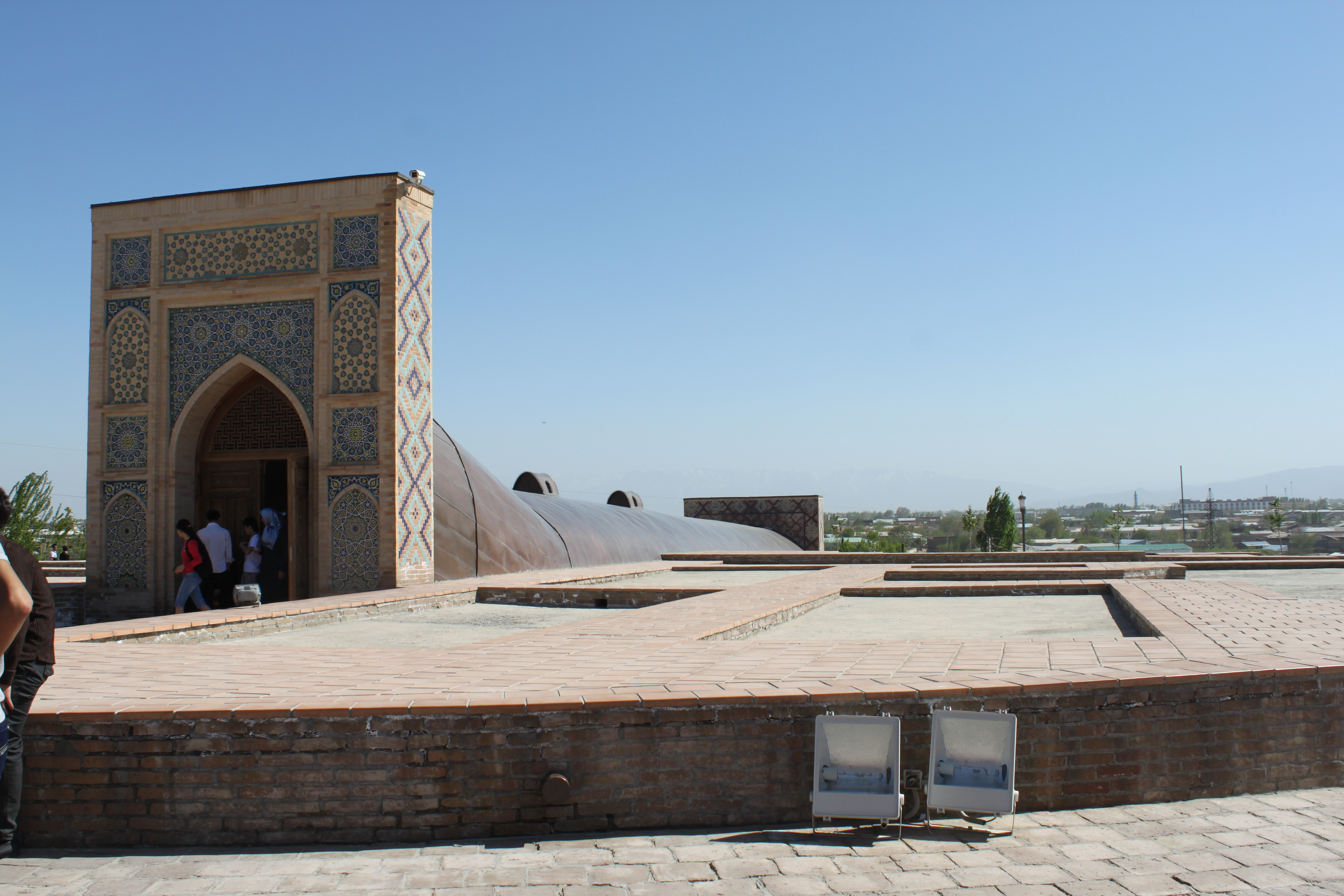
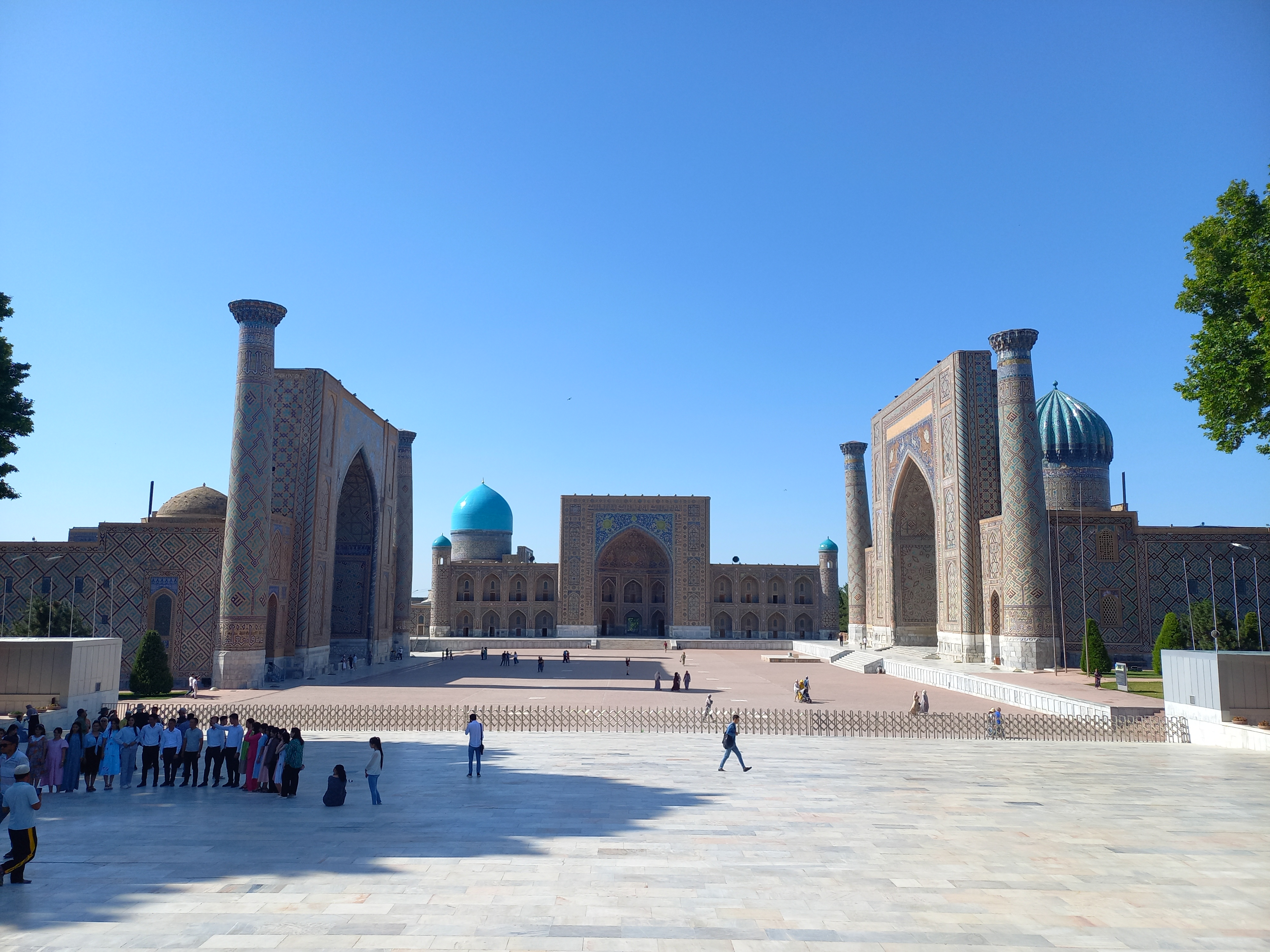
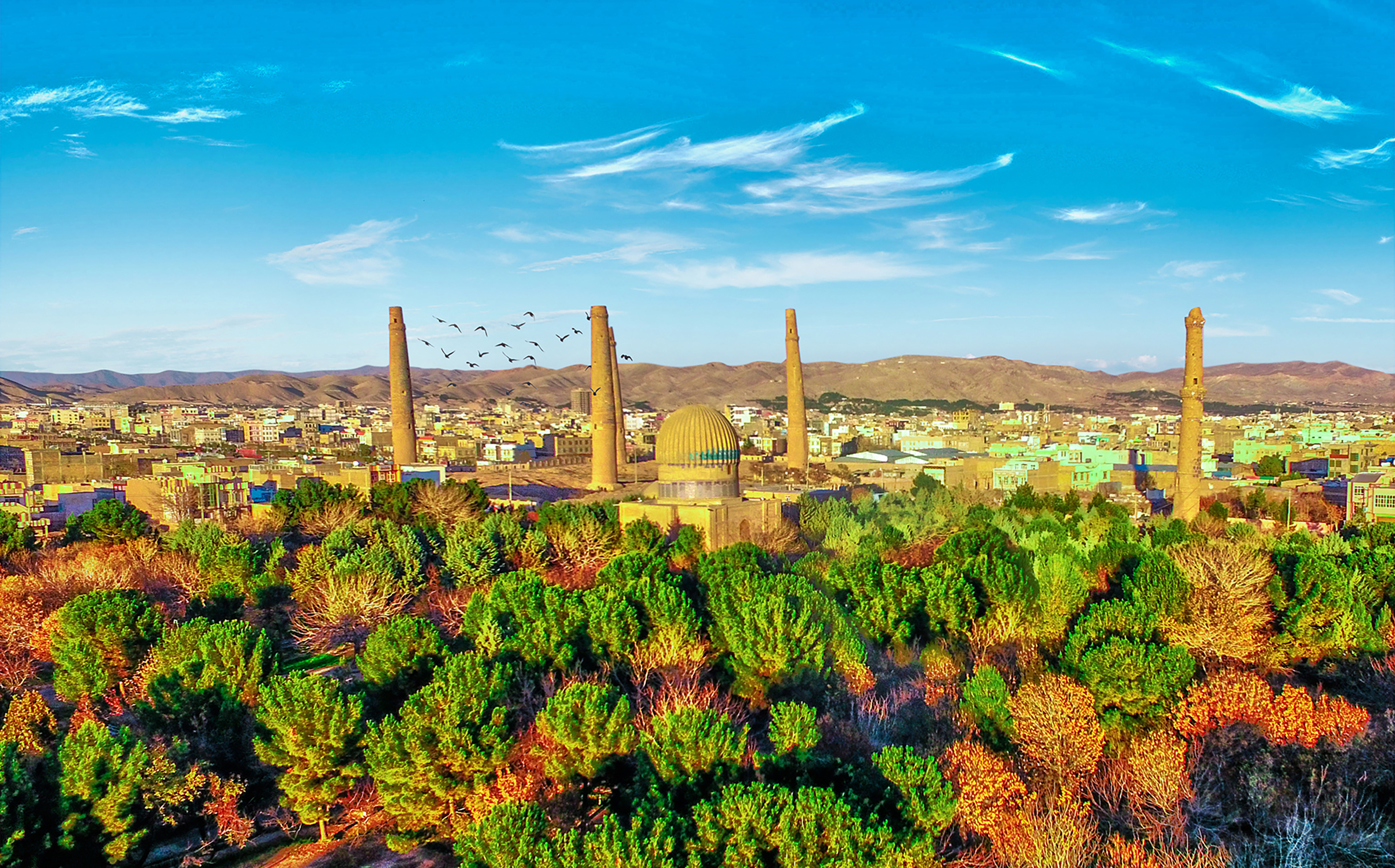
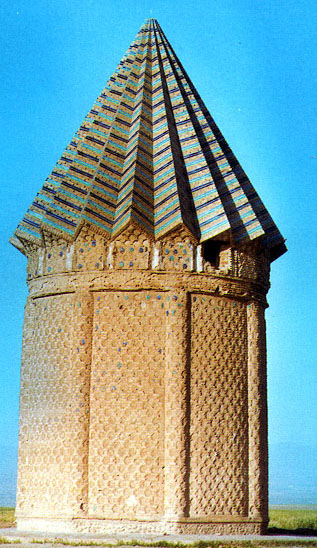
From top to bottom and left to right: Portrait of Tamerlane, Great Mosque of Herat, Interior of Gur-e-Amir, Sculptures of Ulugh Begh, Al-Kashi, Ali Qushji and some other scientists, Tamerlane chess, Ulugh Beg Observatory, View of Registan and its three Islamic schools, Aerial view of the Gawhar Shad Mausoleum, Tomb of Queen Gawhar Shad's sister Gowhar-Taj from the Timurid Necropolis.

The Timurid Renaissance was a period in Asian and Islamic history, following the Islamic Golden Age, and spanning from the late 14th to the early 16th centuries, which saw the revival of the arts and sciences under the Timurid Empire. Its movement spread across the Muslim world. The French word renaissance meaning "rebirth", is used to refer to a period of cultural revival. The use of this term to describe the Timurid period has not been without reservation, with some scholars seeing it as a swan song of Timurid culture.

The Timurid Renaissance reached its peak in the 15th century, after the end of the Mongol invasions and conquests. Based on Islamic ideals, the Timurid Renaissance includes the rebuilding of Samarkand, the invention of Tamerlane Chess by Timur, the reign of Shah Rukh and his consort Gawhar Shad in Herat, along with other polymaths and Islamic scholars, and the establishment of learning centers by Sultan Husayn Bayqara. The reign of Timur led to a revival in classical Persian art. Large-scale building projects were undertaken, creating mausoleums, madrasas, and kitabhane - medieval Islamic book workshops. Mathematical and astronomical studies were reinvigorated, and by the beginning of the 16th century, mastery over firearms was achieved.

Major commissions during Timur's lifetime were the Summer Palace in Shahrisabz, Bibi-Khanym Mosque, and the construction of the Registan. As a result Samarkand, which had previously been a center of scholarship and study, and had been destroyed during the Mongol conquest of Khwarezmia, became the center of the Timurid Renaissance and Islamic civilization in general. The city of Herat also became an important center of intellectual and artistic life in the Muslim world during this time.

The Timurid Renaissance differed from previous Buyid dynasty cultural and artistic developments in that it was not a direct revival of classical models, but rather a broadening of their cultural appeal by including more colloquial styles of the Persian language. In terms of architecture, the Timurid Renaissance was inherited by Mughal India, and significantly influenced other Islamic Gunpowder Empires like Ottoman Turkey and Safavid Iran.

== History ==
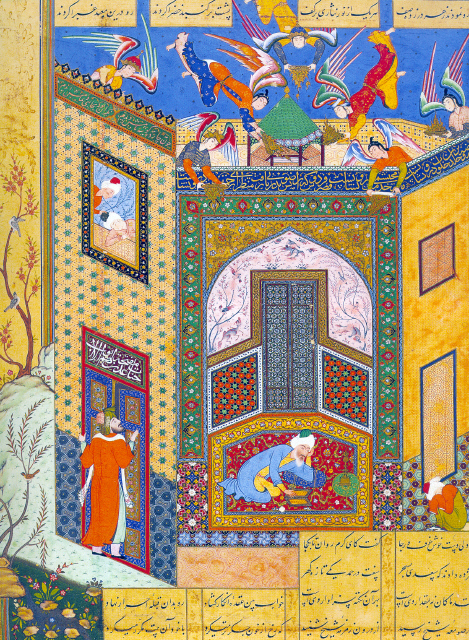
Illustration from Jāmī's Rose Garden of the Pious, dated 1553.

The Timurid Empire was founded by Amir Tamerlane in 1370 after the conquest of several Ilkhanate successor states. After conquering a city, the Timurids commonly spared the lives of the local artisans and deported them to the Timurid capital of Samarkand.

After the Timurids conquered Persia in the early 15th century, many Islamic artistic traits became interwoven with existing Mongol art. Timur's establishment of the Islamic Sharia law later in life made Samarkand one of the centers of Islamic art.

In the mid 15th century the empire moved its capital to Herat, which became a focal point for Timurid art. As with Samarkand, artisans and intellectuals of various ethnic backgrounds soon established Herat as a center for arts and culture. Soon, many of the Timurid cultural expressions became mixed with those of other traditions.

=== Arts ===
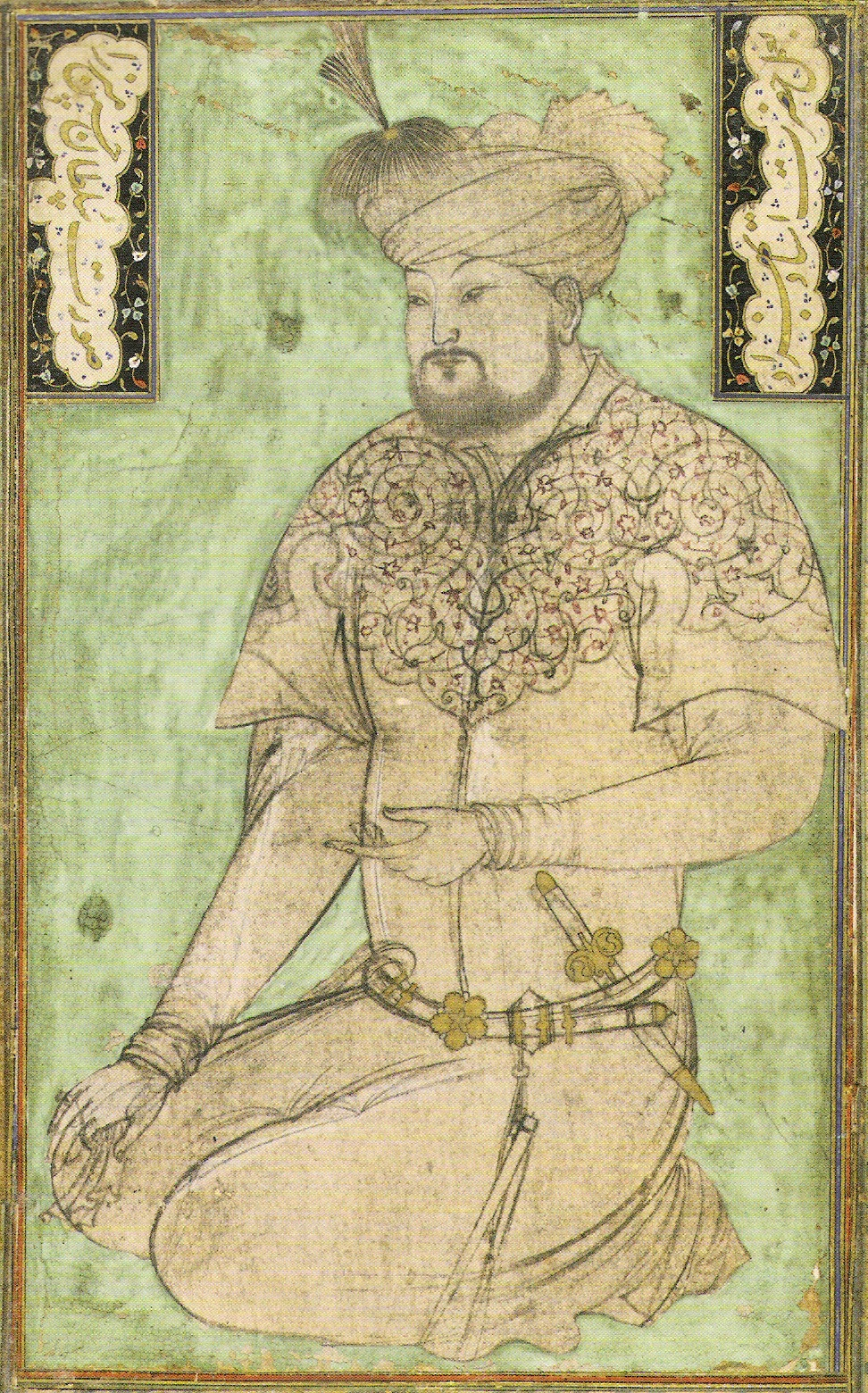
Sultan Husayn Bayqara, a patron of art, constructed multiple centers of learning.

Timurid art absorbed and improved upon the traditional Persian concept of the "Arts of the Book". The new, Timurid-inflected works of art saw illustrated paper (as opposed to parchment) manuscripts produced by the empire's artists. These illustrations were notable for their rich colors and elaborate designs. Due to the quality of the miniature paintings found in these manuscripts, archaeologist and art historian Suzan Yalman of the Metropolitan Museum of Art noted that "the Herat school [of manuscript painting] is often regarded as the apogee of Persian painting.

Timurid silver-inlaid steel is often cited as being of particularly high quality. Painting was not limited to manuscripts. Many Timurid artists also created intricate wall paintings. Many of these wall paintings depicted landscapes derived from both Persian and Chinese artistic tradition. While the subject matter of these paintings was borrowed from other cultures, Timurid wall paintings were eventually refined into their own, unique style.

Mongol artistic traditions were not entirely phased out, as the highly stylized depictions of human figures seen in 15th century Timurid art are derived from this culture.

Sultan Husayn Bayqara's reign saw a further rise in the arts. He was renowned as a benefactor and patron of learning in his kingdom. Sultan Husayn built numerous structures including a famous school. He has been described as "the quintessential Timurid ruler of the later period in Transoxiana." His sophisticated court and generous artistic patronage was a source of admiration, particularly from his cousin, Babur of Mughal India.

=== Timurid architecture ===
Timurid architecture drew on aspects of Seljuk architecture. Turquoise and blue tiles forming intricate linear and geometric patterns decorated the facades of buildings. Sometimes building interiors were decorated similarly, with painting and stucco relief further enriching the effect.

Timurid architecture was the pinnacle of Islamic art in Central Asia. There were spectacular and stately edifices erected by Tamerlane and his successors in Samarkand and Herat. These monumental works helped to disseminate the influence of the Ilkhanid school of art as far as India, where it gave rise to the celebrated Mughal (or Mongol) school of architecture.

Timurid architecture started with the sanctuary of Ahmed Yasawi in present-day Kazakhstan and culminated in Timur's mausoleum Gur-e Amir in Samarkand. Timur's Gur-I Amir, the 14th-century mausoleum of the conqueror is covered with "turquoise Persian tiles". Nearby, in the center of the ancient town, a "Persian style madrassa" (religious school) and a "Persian style mosque" by Timurid Sultan Ulugh Beg is observed. The mausoleums of Timurid princes, with their turquoise and blue-tiled domes, remain among the most refined and exquisite Persian architecture.

Axial symmetry is a characteristic of all major Timurid structures, notably the Shāh-e Zenda in Samarkand, the Musallah complex in Herat, and the mosque of Gawhar Shad in Mashhad. Double domes of various shapes abound, perfused on the outside with brilliant colors. Timur's dominance of the region strengthened the influence of his capital and Persian architecture upon the Indian subcontinent.

=== Metalwork, ceramics, and carving ===
The Timurid Empire also produced quality pieces of metalwork. Steel, iron, brass, and bronze were commonly used as mediums. Timurid silver-inlaid steel is often being cited as being of particularly high quality. Following the collapse of the Timurid Empire, several Iranian and Mesopotamian cultures co-opted Timurid metalwork.

Chinese-style ceramics were produced by Timurid artisans. Jade carving also had some presence in Timurid art.

=== Science ===
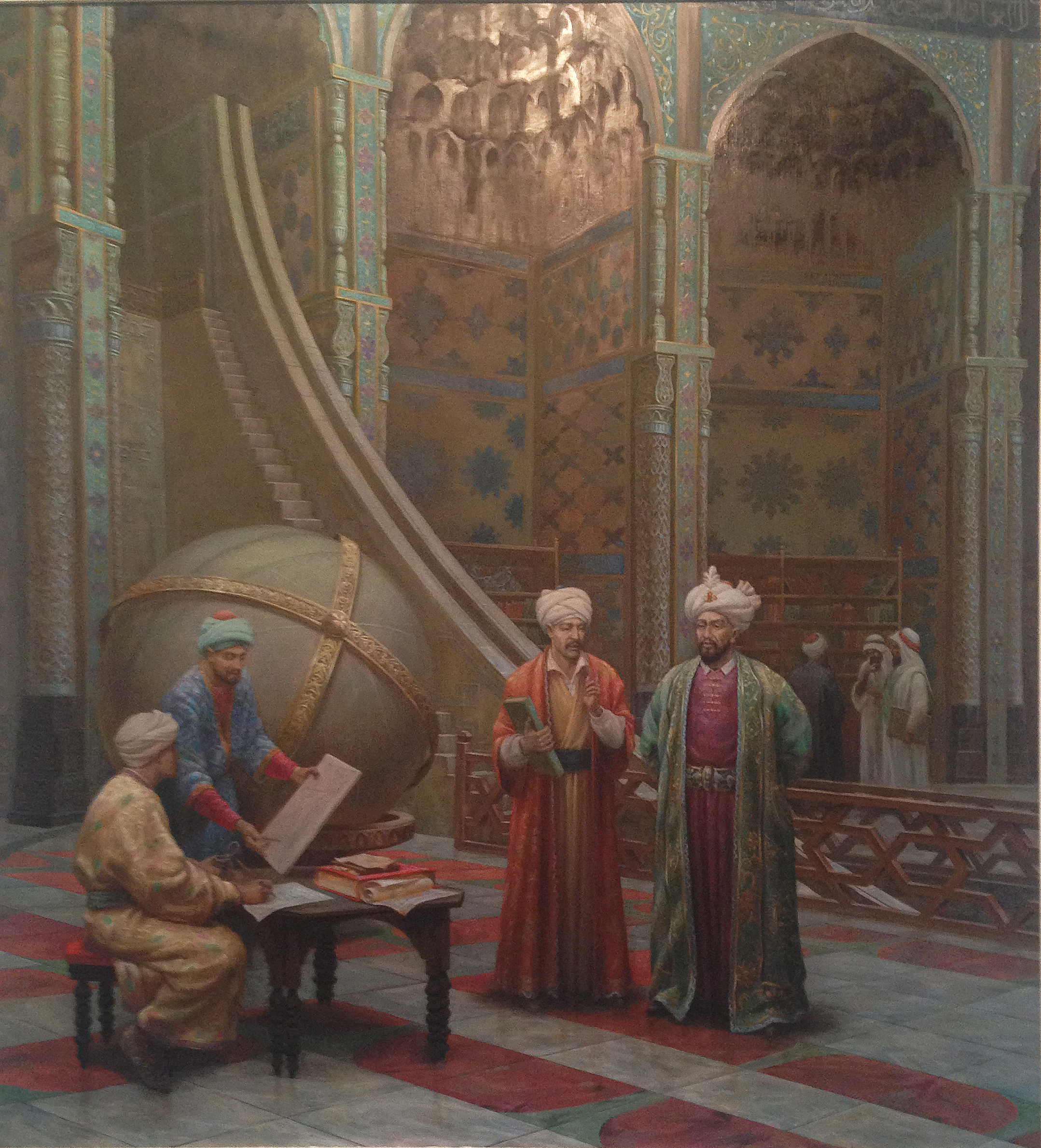
Ulugh Beg and Ali Qushji in the observatory.

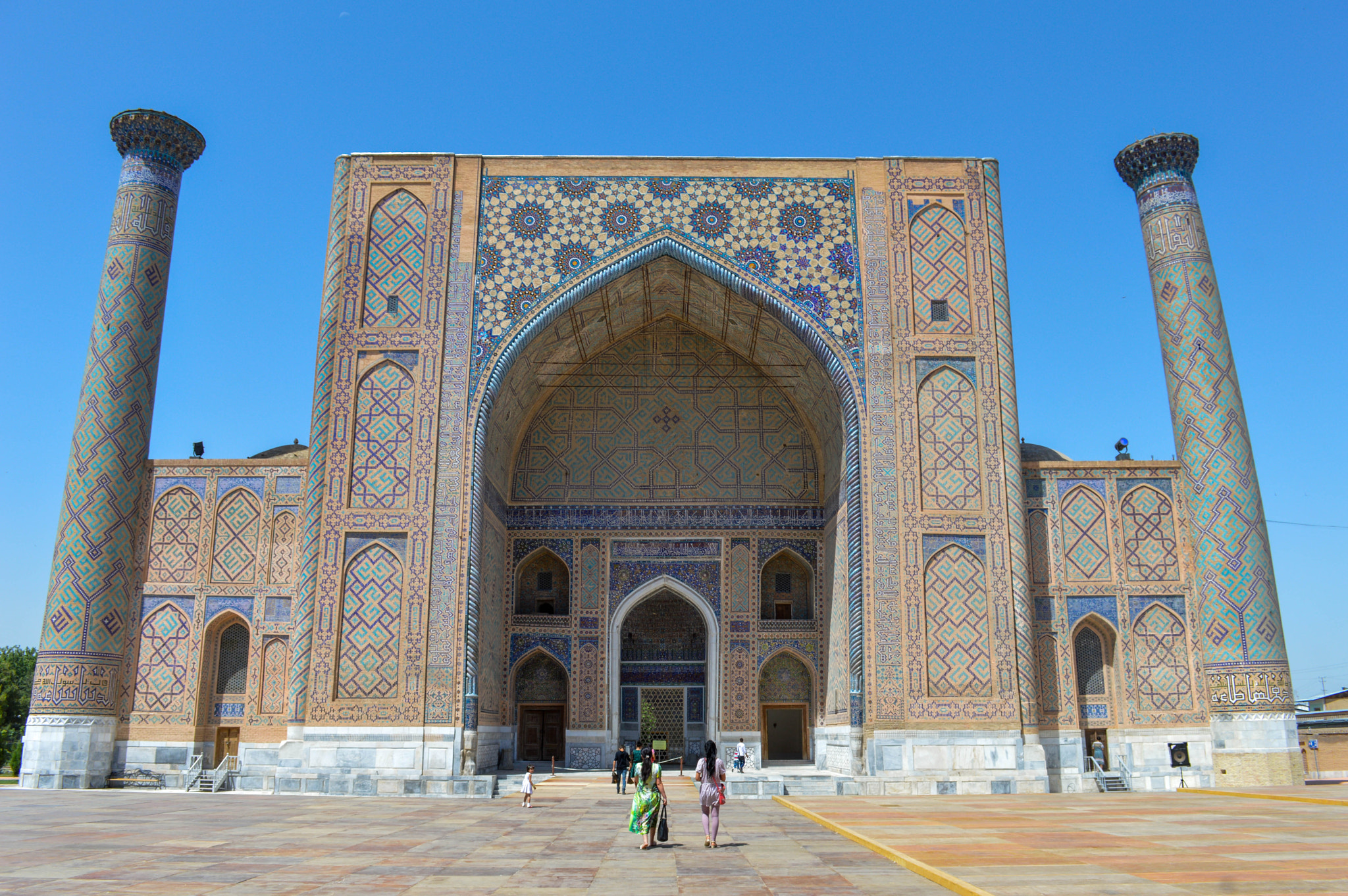
Ulugh Beg Observatory and its Madrasah has been an important centre of astronomical study in Central Asia.

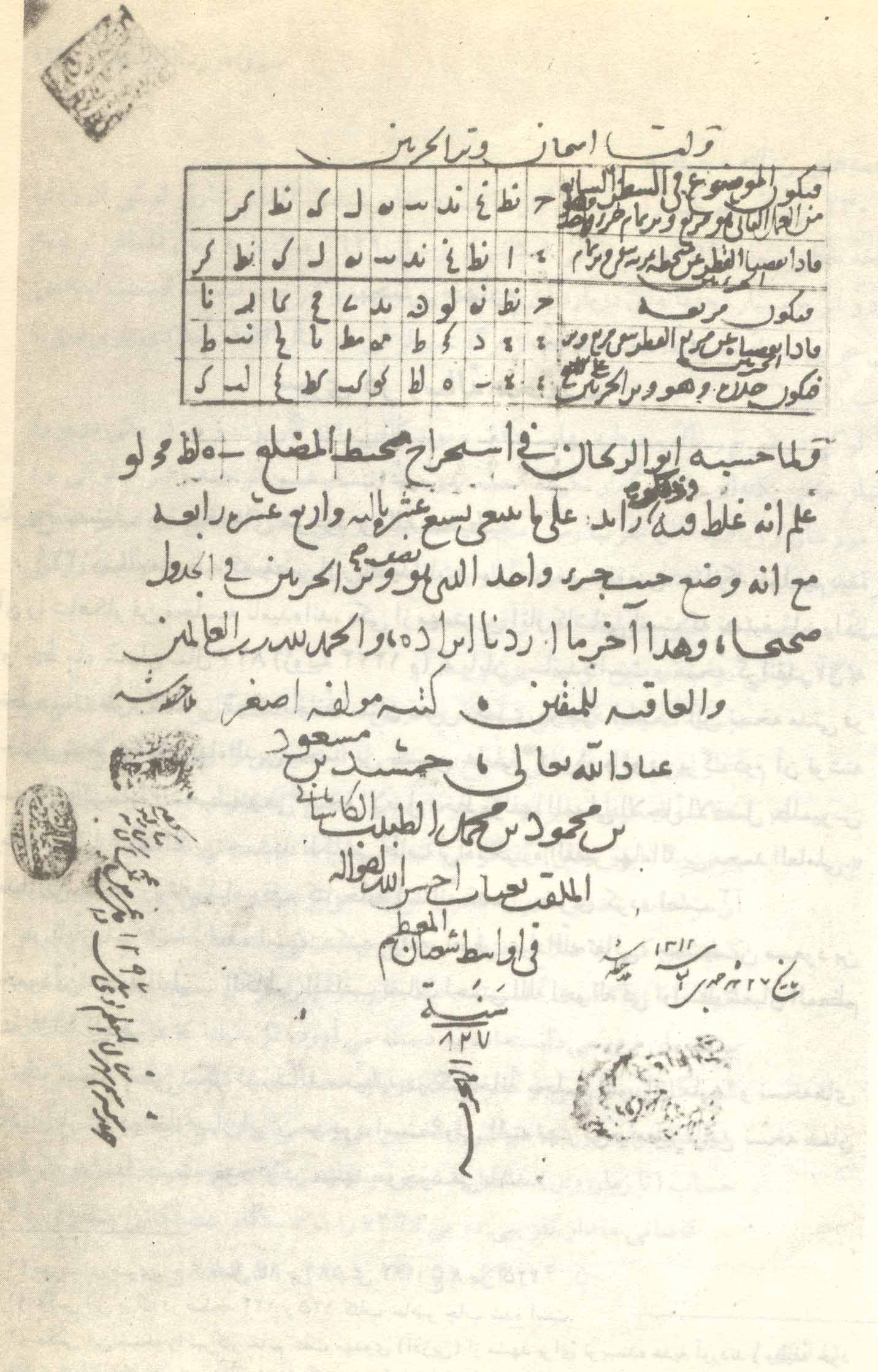
Theorem of Al-Kashi

Jamshid al-Kashi was one of the most influential contributors in the fields of mathematics and astronomy. He got immense support from both Emperor Shah Rukh and Queen Goharshad, who were very interested in the sciences and encouraged theirs court to study the various fields in great depth. Consequently, the period of their power became one of many scholarly achievements.

The reign of Sultan Ulugh Begh saw the scientific peak of the empire. During his rule, al-Kashi produced sine tables to four sexagesimal digits (equivalent to eight decimal places) of accuracy for each degree and includes differences for each minute. He also produced tables dealing with transformations between coordinate systems on the celestial sphere, such as the transformation from the ecliptic coordinate system to the equatorial coordinate system. The Sullam al-Sama was authored, which provided the resolution of difficulties met by predecessors in the determination of distances and sizes of heavenly bodies such as the Earth, the Moon, the Sun and the Stars. The Treatise on Astronomical Observational Instruments was also written which described a variety of different instruments, including the triquetrum and armillary sphere, the equinoctial armillary and solsticial armillary of Mo'ayyeduddin Urdi, the sine and versine instrument of Urdi, the sextant of al-Khujandi, the Fakhri sextant at the Samarqand observatory, a double quadrant Azimuth-altitude instrument he invented, and a small armillary sphere incorporating an alhidade which he invented.

The invention of the Plate of Conjunctions was seen, an analog computing instrument used to determine the time of day at which planetary conjunctions will occur, and for performing linear interpolation. Invented was also a mechanical planetary computer which he called the Plate of Zones, which could graphically solve a number of planetary problems, including the prediction of the true positions in longitude of the Sun and Moon, and the planets in terms of elliptical orbits; the latitudes of the Sun, Moon, and planets; and the ecliptic of the Sun. The instrument also incorporated an alhidade and ruler.

Ulugh Begh founded an institute in Samarkand which soon became a prominent university. Students from all over Central Asia, and beyond, flocked to this academy in the capital city of his sultanate. Consequently, Ulugh Beg gathered many great mathematicians and scientists, including Ali Qushji. Ali made significant development of astronomical physics independent from natural philosophy, and for providing empirical evidence for the Earth's rotation in his treatise, Concerning the Supposed Dependence of Astronomy upon Philosophy. In addition to his contributions to Ulugh Beg's famous work Zij-i-Sultani and to the founding of Sahn-ı Seman Medrese, one of the first centers for the study of various traditional Islamic sciences in the Ottoman caliphate, Ali Kuşçu was also the author of several scientific works and textbooks on astronomy. Qushji's most important astronomical work is Concerning the Supposed Dependence of Astronomy upon Philosophy. Under the influence of Islamic theologians who opposed the interference of Aristotelianism in astronomy, Qushji rejected Aristotelian physics and completely separated natural philosophy from Islamic astronomy, allowing astronomy to become a purely empirical and mathematical science. This allowed him to explore alternatives to the Aristotelian notion of a stationary Earth, as he explored the idea of a moving Earth instead (though Emilie Savage-Smith asserts that no Islamic astronomers proposed a heliocentric universe). He also found empirical evidence for the Earth's rotation through his observation on comets and concluded, on the basis of empirical evidence rather than speculative philosophy, that the moving Earth theory is just as likely to be true as the stationary Earth theory.

=== Legacy ===
Following the decline of the Timurid Empire in the late 15th century, the Gunpowder empires, which were the Ottomans, Safavid dynasty, Mughal India and other empires, co-opted Timurid artistic traditions into their own.

== See also ==
- Timurid art
- Timurid architecture
- Turco-Persian tradition
- Timurid relations with Europe
- Timeline of Samarkand

== Sources ==
- Kennedy, Edward S. (1947), "Al-Kashi's Plate of Conjunctions", Isis, 38 (1–2): 56–59, doi:10.1086/348036, S2CID 143993402
- Kennedy, Edward S. (1950), "A Fifteenth-Century Planetary Computer: al-Kashi's "Tabaq al-Manateq" I. Motion of the Sun and Moon in Longitude", Isis, 41 (2): 180–183, doi:10.1086/349146, PMID 15436217, S2CID 43217299
- Kennedy, Edward S. (1951), "An Islamic Computer for Planetary Latitudes", Journal of the American Oriental Society, 71 (1), American Oriental Society: 13–21, doi:10.2307/595221, JSTOR 595221
- Kennedy, Edward S. (1952), "A Fifteenth-Century Planetary Computer: al-Kashi's "Tabaq al-Maneteq" II: Longitudes, Distances, and Equations of the Planets", Isis, 43 (1): 42–50, doi:10.1086/349363, S2CID 123582209
- Ragep, F. Jamil (2001a), "Tusi and Copernicus: The Earth's Motion in Context", Science in Context, 14 (1–2), Cambridge University Press: 145–163, doi:10.1017/s0269889701000060, S2CID 145372613
