= Persian Renaissance =

Persian Renaissance or Iranian Renaissance may refer to:

- Iranian Intermezzo (821–1062), a period in Iranian history characterized by re-emergence of Iranian dynasties
- Timurid Renaissance (1370–1508), cultural movement between 14th and 16th centuries in Persia and Central Asia
