= Qāḍī Zāda al-Rūmī =

Islamic mathematician-astronomer

- Born: Salah al-Din Musa Pasha; 1364; Bursa
- Died: 1436 (aged 71–72); Samarkand
- Occupations: Astronomer and mathematician
- Employer: Ulugh Beg Observatory
- Notable work: Zīj-i Sulṭānī

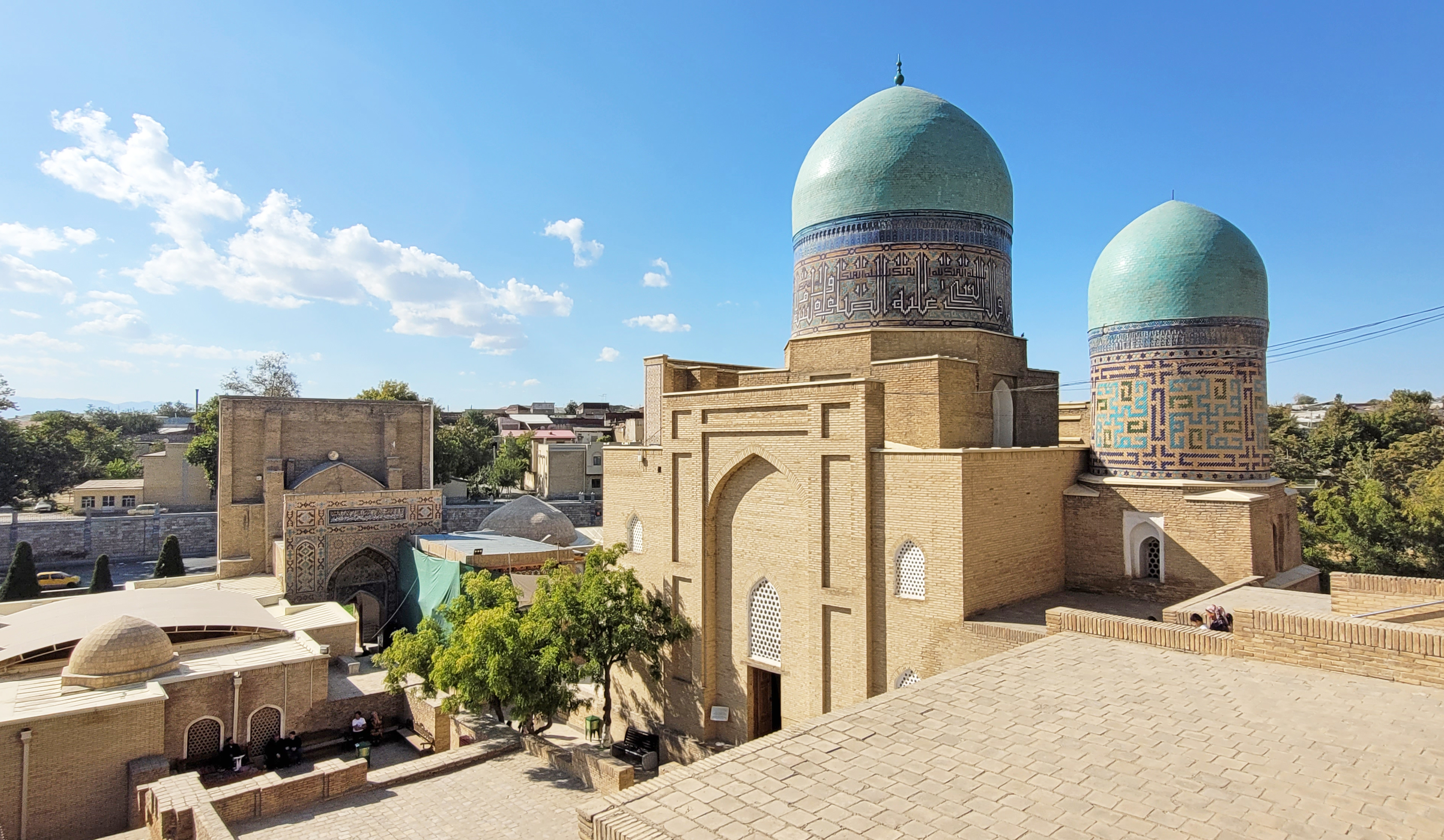
Qāḍī Zāda al-Rūmī Mausoleum in Shah-i-Zinda, Samarkand

Qāḍī Zāda al-Rūmī (1364 in Bursa, Ottoman Empire – 1436 in Samarqand, Timurid Empire), whose actual name was Salah al-Din Musa Pasha (qāḍī zāda means "son of the judge", al-rūmī "the Roman" indicating he came from Asia Minor, which was once Roman), was a Turkish astronomer and mathematician who worked at the observatory in Samarkand. He computed sin 1° to an accuracy of 10^{−12}.

Together with Ulugh Beg, al-Kāshī and a few other astronomers, Qāḍī Zāda produced the Zij-i-Sultani, the first comprehensive stellar catalogue since the Maragheh observatory's Zij-i Ilkhani two centuries earlier. The Zij-i Sultani contained the positions of 992 stars.

== His works ==
- Sharh al-Mulakhkhas (Commentary on Jaghmini's compendium on the science of Astronomy)
- Sharh Ashkal al-Ta'sis (Commentary on Samarkandi's Arithmetics)
