= Gunpowder empires =

Term for early modern Muslim empires

Gunpowder Empires
- 16th century – 18th century
Islamic Golden Age; Timurid Renaissance	Muslim world
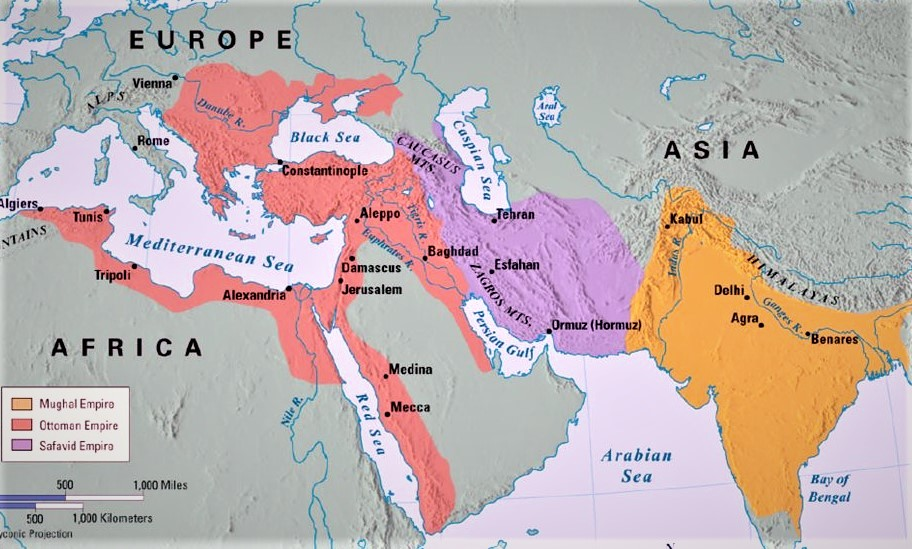
- The gunpowder empires c. 1680

"Gunpowder empires", or "Islamic gunpowder empires", is a term coined by the American historian Marshall G. S. Hodgson in 1974 and taken up by William H. McNeill. McNeill and Hodgson focused on the spread of gunpowder from China, the development of military technology, and its role in the rise of empires in East Asia, Europe, and India. They describe nearly simultaneous rise of three early modern Muslim empires: the Ottoman Empire, Safavid Empire, and the Mughal Empire, which flourished between the mid-16th and early 18th centuries.

The gunpowder empires conquered vast amounts of territory with the use and deployment of newly invented firearms, especially cannon and small arms; together they stretched from Southeast Europe and North Africa in the west to Bengal and Arakan in the east. In the case of Europe, the introduction of gunpowder weapons also prompted changes such as the rise of centralised monarchical states. As a result, these empires were among the most stable of the early modern period, leading to commercial expansion, cultural patronage, and the consolidation of political and legal institutions.

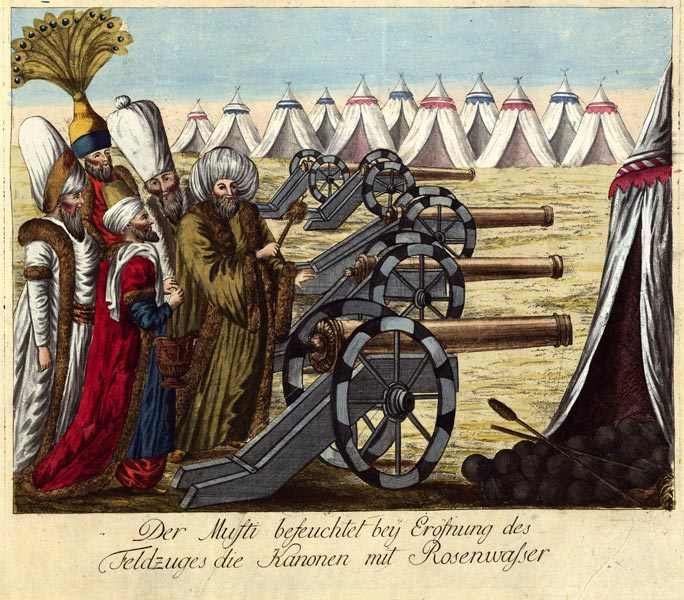
A mufti sprinkling a cannon with rosewater (engraving by Hieronymus Löschenkohl, 1788)

Hodgson held that these changes in the gunpowder empires went beyond military organisation. The Mughals, based in the Indian subcontinent, inherited in part the Timurid Renaissance, and are recognised for their lavish architecture and for having heralded in Bengal an era of what some describe as proto-industrialization. The Safavids created an efficient and modern state administration for Iran and sponsored major developments in the fine arts. The sultans of the Ottoman Empire controlled the holy cities of Mecca and Medina, and hence were recognised as Caliphs. The power, wealth, culture and other various contributions made by these Islamic empires significantly influenced the course of world history.

== The Hodgson–McNeill concept ==
The phrase was coined by Marshall Hodgson and his colleague William H. McNeill at the University of Chicago. Hodgson used the phrase in the title of Book 5 ("The Second Flowering: The Empires of Gunpowder Times") of his highly influential three-volume work, The Venture of Islam (1974). Hodgson saw gunpowder weapons as the key to the "military patronage states of the Later Middle Period" which replaced the unstable, geographically limited confederations of Turkic tribal confederations, which prevailed in post-Mongol times. Hodgson defined a "military patronage state" as one having three characteristics:

first, a legitimization of independent dynastic law; second, the conception of the whole state as a single military force; third, the attempt to explain all economic and high cultural resources as appanages of the chief military families.

Such states grew "out of Mongol notions of greatness", but "[s]uch notions could fully mature and create stable bureaucratic empires only after gunpowder weapons and their specialized technology attained a primary place in military life."

McNeill argued that whenever such states "were able to monopolize the new artillery, central authorities were able to unite larger territories into new, or newly consolidated, empires." Monopolization was key. Although Europe pioneered the development of new artillery in the fifteenth century, no state monopolized it. Gun-casting know-how had been concentrated in the Low Countries near the mouths of the Scheldt and Rhine rivers. France and the Habsburgs divided those territories, resulting in an arms standoff. By contrast, such monopolies allowed states to create militarized empires in West Asia, Russia, and India, and "in a considerably modified fashion" in China, Korea, and Japan.

== Recent views on the concept ==
More recently, the Hodgson–McNeill "gunpowder empire" hypothesis has been called into disfavour as a neither "adequate [n]or accurate" explanation, although the term remains in use. Reasons other than (or in addition to) military technology have been offered for the nearly simultaneous rise of three centralized military empires in contiguous areas dominated by decentralized Turkic tribes. One explanation, called "Confessionalization" by historians of fifteenth century Europe, invokes examination of how the relation of church and state "mediated through confessional statements and church ordinances" lead to the origins of absolutist polities. Douglas Streusand uses the Safavids as an example:

The Safavids from the beginning imposed a new religious identity on their general population; they did not seek to develop a national or linguistic identity, but their policy had that effect.

One problem of the Hodgson–McNeill theory is that the acquisition of firearms does not seem to have preceded the initial acquisition of territory constituting the imperial critical mass of any of the three early modern Islamic empires, except in the case of the Mughal empire. Moreover, it seems that the commitment to military autocratic rule pre-dated the acquisition of gunpowder weapons in all three cases. Nor does it seem to be the case that the acquisition of gunpowder weapons and their integration into the military was influenced by which variety of Islam the particular empire promoted. Whether or not gunpowder was inherently linked to the existence of any of these three empires, it cannot be questioned that each of the three acquired artillery and firearms early in their history and made such weapons an integral part of their military tactics.

Michael Axworthy has pointed out that the label is misleading in the case of the Safavids, as unlike contemporary European armies, the Safavid military mostly used swords, lances, and bows well into the mid-18th century. It was not until the rule of Nader Shah's Afsharid Empire that the majority of Iran's troops would be equipped with firearms for the first time.

== History ==
=== Gunpowder empires of the Muslim world ===
==== Ottoman Empire ====
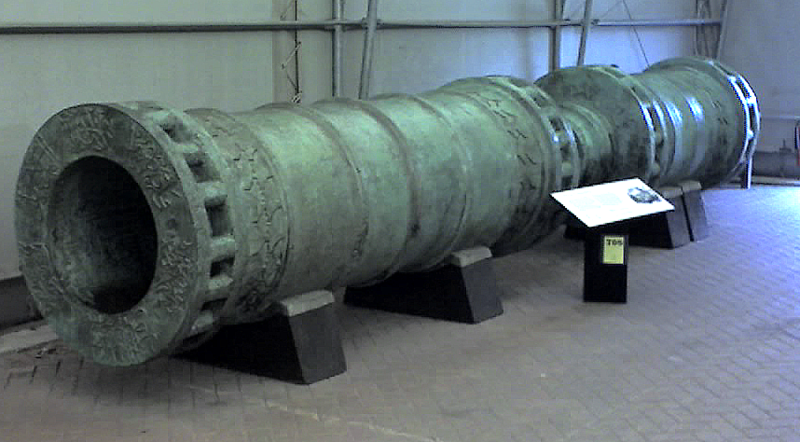
The bronze Dardanelles Gun on display at Fort Nelson in Hampshire. Similar cannons were used by the Ottoman Turks in the siege of Constantinople in 1453.

The first of the three empires to acquire gunpowder weapons was the Ottoman Empire. By the 14th century, the Ottomans had adopted gunpowder artillery. The adoption of the gunpowder weapons by the Ottomans was so rapid that they "preceded both their European and Middle Eastern adversaries in establishing centralized and permanent troops specialized in the manufacturing and handling of firearms." But it was their use of artillery that shocked their adversaries and impelled the other two Islamic empires to accelerate their weapons programs. The Ottomans had artillery at least by the reign of Bayezid I and used them in the sieges of Constantinople in 1399 and 1402. They finally proved their worth as siege engines in the successful siege of Salonica in 1430. The Ottomans employed Middle Eastern as well as European foundries to cast their cannons, and by the siege of Constantinople in 1453, they had large enough cannons to batter the walls of the city, to the surprise of the defenders.

The Ottoman military's regularized use of firearms proceeded ahead of the pace of their European counterparts. The janissaries had been an infantry bodyguard using bows and arrows. During the rule of Sultan Mehmed II they were drilled with firearms and became "perhaps the first standing infantry force equipped with firearms in the world." The Janissaries are thus considered the first modern standing armies. The combination of artillery and janissary firepower proved decisive at Varna in 1444 against a force of Crusaders, Başkent in 1473 against the Aq Qoyunlu, and Mohács in 1526 against Hungary. But the battle which convinced the Safavids and the Mughals of the efficacy of gunpowder was Chaldiran.

The matchlock arquebus began to be used by the janissary corps by the 1440s. The musket later appeared in the Ottoman Empire by 1465. Damascus steel was later used in the production of firearms such as the musket from the 16th century. At the Battle of Mohács in 1526, the janissaries equipped with 2000 tüfenks (usually translated as musket) "formed nine consecutive rows and they fired their weapons row by row," in a "kneeling or standing position without the need for additional support or rest." The Chinese later adopted the Ottoman kneeling position for firing. In 1598, Chinese writer Zhao Shizhen described Turkish muskets as being superior to European muskets. The Ming-era Chinese work the Wubei Zhi or "Treatise on Armament Technology or Records of Armaments and Military Provisions" of 1621 later described Turkish muskets that used a rack and pinion mechanism, which was not known to have been used in any European or Chinese firearms at the time.

The Dardanelles Gun (Ottoman Turkish: شاهی, romanized: Şahi, lit. 'Royal') was designed and cast in bronze in 1464 by Munir Ali. The Dardanelles Gun was still present for duty more than 340 years later in 1807, when a Royal Navy force appeared and commenced the Dardanelles operation. Turkish forces loaded the ancient relics with propellant and projectiles and fired them at the British ships. The British squadron suffered 28 casualties from this bombardment.

At Chaldiran, the Ottomans met the Safavids in battle for the first time. Sultan Selim I moved east with his field artillery in 1514 to confront what he perceived as a Twelver Shi'a threat instigated by Shah Ismail I in favor of Selim's rivals. Ismail staked his reputation as a divinely-favored ruler on an open cavalry charge against a fixed Ottoman position. The Ottomans deployed their cannons between the carts that carried them, which also provided cover for the armed janissaries. The result of the charge was devastating losses to the Safavid cavalry. The defeat was so thorough that the Ottoman forces were able to move on and briefly occupy the Safavid capital, Tabriz. Only the limited campaign radius of the Ottoman army prevented it from holding the city and ending the Safavid rule.

==== Safavid Empire ====
Although the Chaldiran defeat brought an end to Ismail's territorial expansion program, the shah nonetheless took immediate steps to protect against the real threat from the Ottoman sultanate by arming his troops with gunpowder weapons. Within two years of Chaldiran, Ismail had a corps of tofangchi (musketeers) numbering 8,000, and by 1521, possibly 20,000. After Abbas the Great reformed the army (around 1598), the Safavid forces had an artillery corps of 500 cannons as well as 12,000 musketeers.

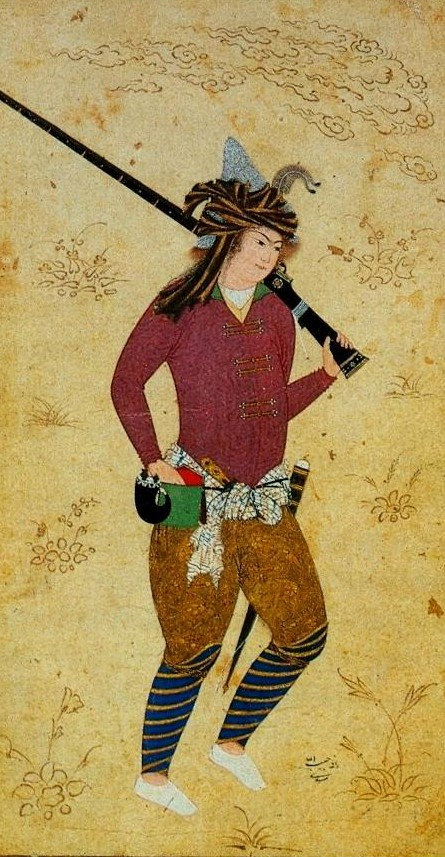
A tofangchi (Persian Musketeer) in time of Abbas the Great by Habib-Allah Mashadi after Falsafi (Berlin Museum of Islamic Art).

The Safavids first put their gunpowder arms to good use against the Uzbeks, who had invaded eastern Persia during the civil war that followed Ismail's death. The young Shah Tahmasp I headed an army to relieve Herat and encountered the Uzbeks on 24 September 1528 at Jam, where the Safavids decisively beat the Uzbeks. The shah's army deployed cannons (swivel guns on wagons) in the center protected by wagons with cavalry on both flanks. Mughal emperor Babur described the formation at Jam as "in the Anatolian fashion." The several thousand gun-bearing infantry also massed in the center as did the Janissaries of the Ottoman army. Although the Uzbek cavalry engaged and turned the Safavid army on both flanks, the Safavid center held (because it was not directly engaged by the Uzbeks). Rallying under Tahmasp's personal leadership, the infantry of the center engaged and scattered the Uzbek center and secured the field.

==== Mughal Empire ====
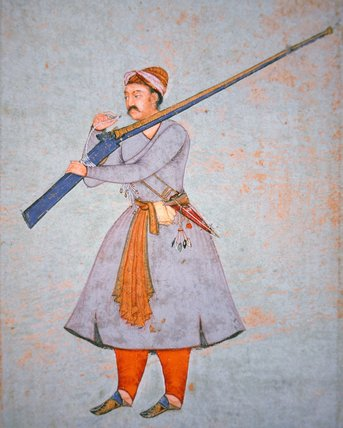
Mughal Toradar

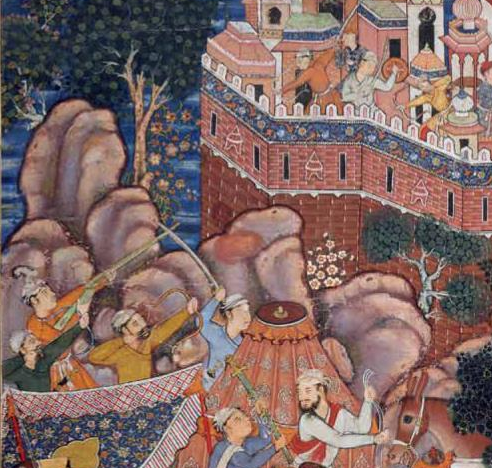
Mughal musketeer

By the time he was invited by the Lodi governor of Lahore Daulat Khan to support his rebellion against Lodi Sultan Ibrahim Khan, Babur was familiar with gunpowder firearms and field artillery and a method for deploying them. Babur had employed Ottoman expert Ustad Ali Quli, who showed Babur the standard Ottoman formation—artillery and firearm-equipped infantry protected by wagons in the center, and mounted archers on both wings. Babur used this formation at the First Battle of Panipat in 1526, where the Afghan and Rajput forces loyal to the Delhi sultanate, though superior in numbers but without the gunpowder weapons, were defeated. Similarly Babur also used these gunpowder weapons to win the decisive Battle of Khanwa against the numerically superior Rajput confederacy. The decisive victory of the Timurid forces is one reason opponents rarely met Mughal princes in pitched battle over the course of the empire's history. The reigns of Akbar The Great, Shah Jahan and Aurangzeb have been described as a major height of Indian history. By the time of Aurangzeb, the Mughal army was predominantly composed of Indian Muslims, with tribal elements like the Sadaat-e-Bara forming the vanguard of the Mughal cavalry. The Mughal Empire became a powerful geopolitical entity with at times, 24.2% of the world population. The Mughals inherited elements of Persian culture and art, as did the Ottomans and Safavids. Indian Muslims maintained the dominance of artillery in India, and even after the fall of the Mughal empire, various non-Muslim Indian kingdoms continued to recruit Hindustani Muslims as artillery officers in their armies.

=== Gunpowder empires of East Asia ===
East Asian powers and their military success are commonly overlooked compared to the Islamic empires and European empires. The impact of gunpowder combat in East Asia, however, is comparable to that in the Islamic gunpowder empires.

==== China ====
The first firearms originated in 10th-century China, and modern forms of small firearms came to China by various routes. During the golden age of East Asian piracy between the 1540s and 1560s, Ming dynasty armies probably copied weapons they seized during sea battles. For instance, they may have replicated weapons surrendered in 1558 by the powerful mariner Wang Zhi, who commanded thousands of armed men. This particular account on arquebus technology was the first to spark the interest of Ming officials for the Chinese to broaden their use of these weapons.

Turkish arquebuses may have reached China before Portuguese ones. In Zhao Shizhen's book of 1598, the Shenqipu, there were illustrations of Ottoman Turkish musketmen alongside European musketeers with detailed illustrations of their muskets. There was also illustration and description of how the Chinese had adopted the Ottoman kneeling position in firing. Zhao Shizhen described the Turkish muskets as being superior to the European muskets. The Wubei Zhi (1621) later described Turkish muskets that used a rack-and-pinion mechanism, which was not known to have been used in any European or Chinese firearms at the time.

The Chinese intensively practiced tactical strategies based on firearm use, which resulted in military success. Qi Jiguang, a revered Ming military leader, drilled his soldiers to extremes so that their performance in battle would be successful. In addition, Qi Jiguang also used innovative battle techniques like volleys, countermarchs, and division into teams, and it even encouraged flexible formation to adapt to the battlefield.

During the Sino-Dutch War beginning in 1661, Southern Ming commander Zheng Chenggong (Koxinga) used similar tactics to Qi Jiguang effectively in battle. The Chinese defeated the Dutch forces through their strict adherence to discipline and ability to stay in formation. Ultimately, it was their technique and training that defeated the Dutch weapons.

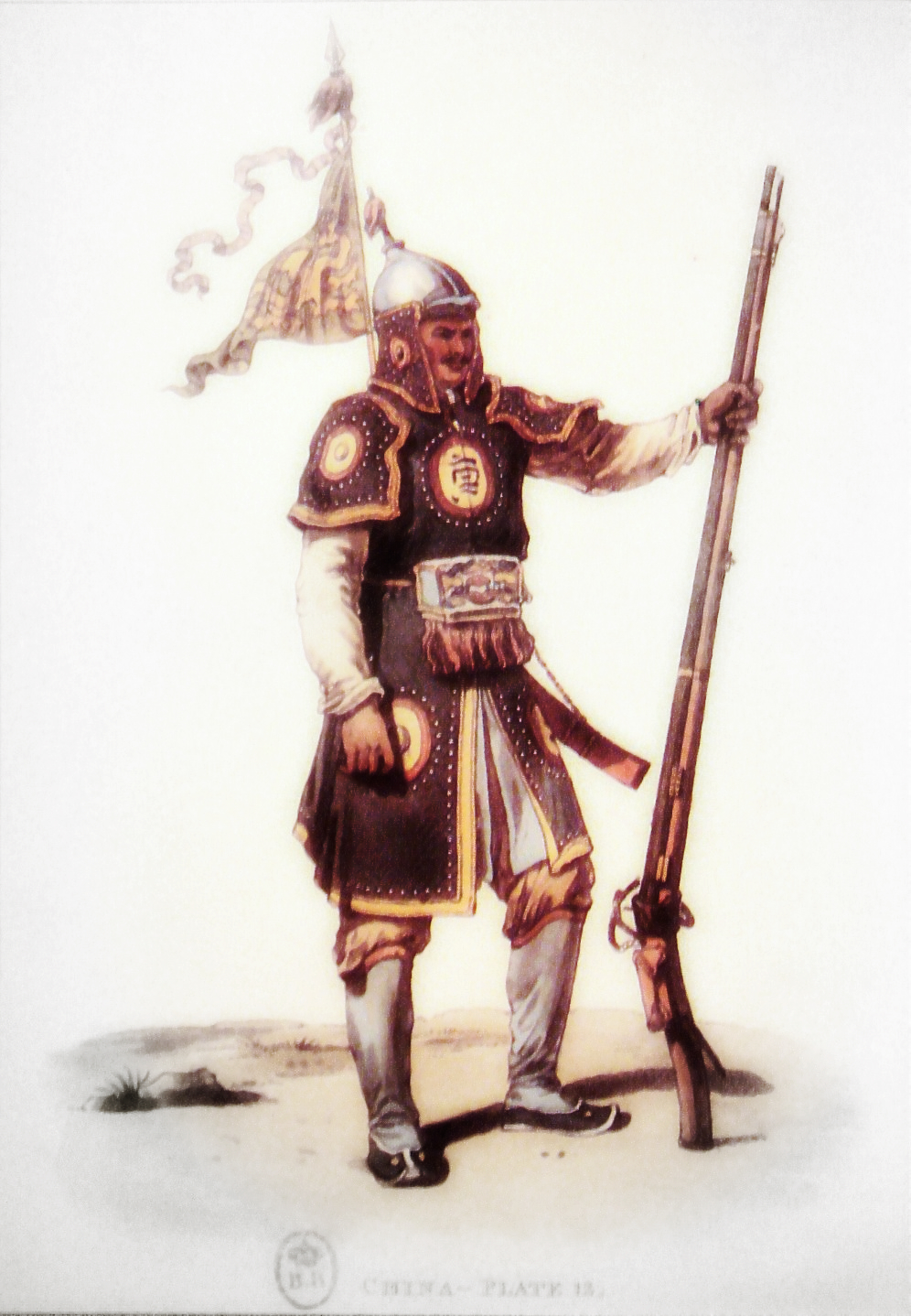
A soldier from the Qianlong era, holding an arquebus.

In 1631, "Heavy Troops" that could build and operate European-style cannon, The imported cannons in the Qing dynasty had a high reputation such as hongyipao. The Manchu elite did not concern themselves directly with guns and their production, preferring instead to delegate the task to Han-Chinese craftsmen, who produced for the Qing a similar composite metal cannon known as the "Shenwei grand general." Cannons and muskets are also widely used in wars known as 'Ten Great Campaigns'. However, after the Qing gained hegemony over East Asia in the mid-18th century, the practice of casting composite metal cannons fell into disuse until the dynasty faced external threats once again in the Opium War of 1840, at which point smoothbore cannons were already starting to become obsolete as a result of rifled barrels.

==== Japan ====
The Japanese adopted the use of the Portuguese arquebus in the middle of the 16th century. Multiple accounts have said that Portuguese men working for Chinese pirates ended up in Japan by chance and impressed the local ruler with the weapons. Soon after, the Japanese started mass-producing the Portuguese style weapon for themselves. In other accounts, this firearm technology may have trickled in to Japan as early as 1540 from the constant in and out flow of Japanese mercenaries who could have picked up firearms in their travels. Soon, Japanese soldiers carrying firearms would greatly outnumber those with other weapons.

Tonio Andrade cited that the Military Revolution Model that gave the Europeans so much military success included the use of superior drilling techniques. The drilling technique he was speaking of was the musketeer volley technique. The volley technique was said to have been invented by Japanese Warlord Oda Nobunaga. He used the same technique that Japanese archers used, but the effect that the technique had to allow soldiers to reload at the same time others could fire was devastating to their enemies.

==== Korea ====
Koreans used Chinese and Korean firearms as early as the late 14th century. They were also quite adept and innovative with their strategies on the battlefield. There were accounts of Koreans using a type of volley technique in 1447. But the Imjin War between the Japanese against the Koreans and the Ming starting in 1592 and ending in 1598 would change Joseon perspectives on warfare. While the war ultimately ended in a Japanese defeat, it forced the Koreans to realize that they needed to adopt the use of the musket as well as Japanese and Chinese methods. The Koreans quickly issued the musket as the base of their military tactic, and their musketeers became more than 50 percent of the military by 1594. They trained using manuals based on Qi Jiguang's techniques, such as the volley, while incorporating their own methods, too. These events marked the beginning of a Korean military revolution in which the Koreans could combat their enemies using modern equipment and methods of warfare.

There were many instances where the Korean military used their new techniques effectively. In 1619, the Koreans aided the Ming against the Manchus, a great military force. While the Koreans and Ming lost, a Korean unit did exhibit their techniques successfully in battle. Then, in 1627 and 1636, the Koreans faced the Manchus alone, again showing their competency in battle by using their musket tactics. Again, they lost in battle to the Manchus in both battles. In 1654 and 1658, the Koreans aided the Qing in battle against the Russians for control over land in Manchuria. In these instances, the Koreans showed their superior tactics and were the reason for the Russians' defeat.

=== Gunpowder empires of Southeast Asia ===
==== Vietnam ====
Comparatively little attention has been made to the use and innovation of gunpowder in the expansion of Vietnam. It is theorised that the Vietnamese, after adopting firearms from China, also introduced some innovations in firearms to China – although other scholars disagree. Regardless, the use of gunpowder technology has left an undeniable mark in Vietnamese history, allowing the "southward march" and significant expansion of Vietnamese territory.

==== Majapahit Empire ====
During the Majapahit era, firearms were developed by Javanese blacksmiths. It is believed that firearm technology was first introduced during the Mongol invasion of Java.Consequently, the Majapahit naval fleet was equipped with cetbang (bronze breech-loading cannons).

== Gunpowder in Europe ==
Europeans are said to have pushed gunpowder technology to its limits, improving the formulas that existed and devising new uses of the substance after it was introduced to Europe via the Silk Road in the thirteenth century. Europeans were improving gunpowder a century after the first gun was invented in China.

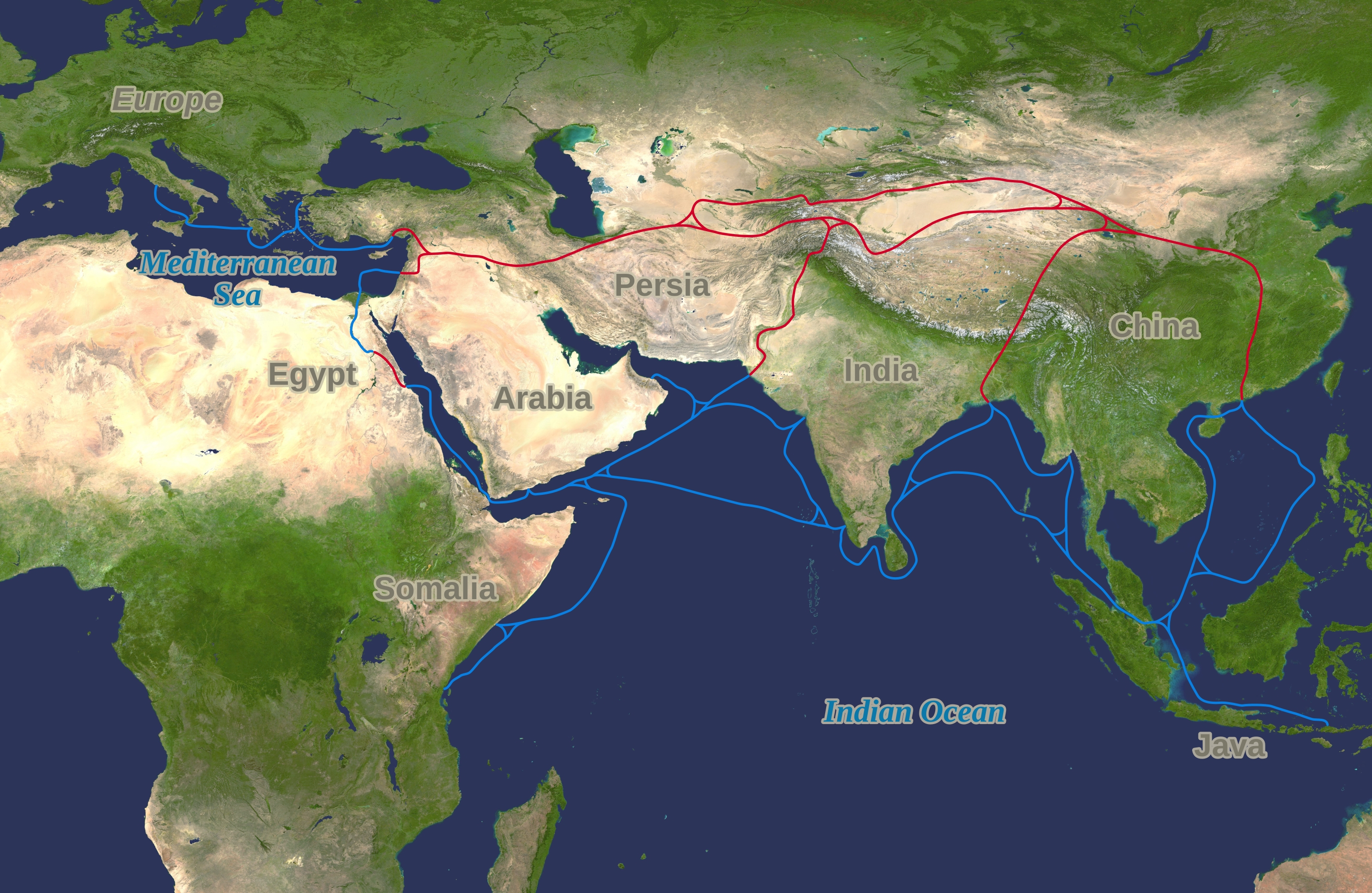
Silk Roads: the Routes Network of Chang'an-Tianshan.|alt=Official name Silk Roads: the Routes Network of Chang'an-Tianshan Type Cultural Criteria ii, iii, iv, vi Designated 2014 (38th session) Reference no. 1442 Region Asia-Pacific

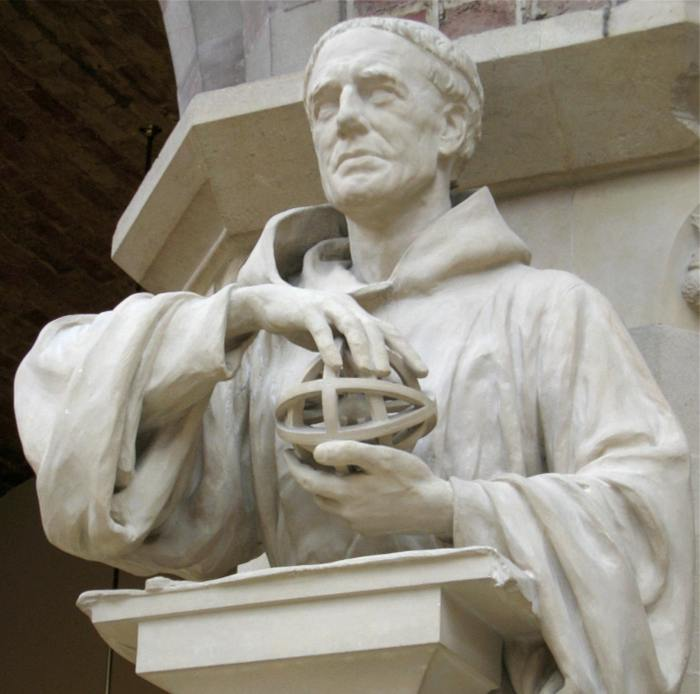
Roger Bacon

Roger Bacon, a renowned early European alchemist (1214 – 1292), set forth the marvels of the world; key among them was the ingredients of gunpowder. With these ingredients available, European scientists, inventors and alchemists went on to create corned gunpowder, which had a different refinement process. It entailed adding a wet substance to the gunpowder and then drying it as a mixture. With this improved gunpowder technology, German friar Berthold Schwarz invented the first European cannon in 1353. Due to constant warfare, Europe saw an exponential growth innovation of gunpowder firearms, making it the most advanced in the whole world. Europeans improved the gunpowder firearms which had been made in China and the Middle East, creating much stronger and more durable rifles using advanced European metalworking techniques. They learned how to calculate the amount of force exerted by the gas contained in a gun's chamber, which led to guns with the power to fire greater distances.

Improved gunpowder from Europe later, in 1520, reached China on a Portuguese ship, though Turkish arquebuses may have reached China before Portuguese ones. The Ottomans and Portuguese introduced the cannon, improved rifles and other advances to China, hundreds of years after gunpowder's original invention in China, bringing gunpowder's journey through Asia full circle.

== In fiction ==
Harry Turtledove wrote Gunpowder Empire, an alternative history novel whose premise is that, had the Roman Empire survived until the invention of gunpowder, it might have become a "Gunpowder Empire" similar to the above and survived into the 21st century.

== See also ==
- History of gunpowder
- Hydraulic empire
- Political history of the world
- Timeline of the gunpowder age

== Sources ==
- Ágoston, Gábor (2001). "Merce Prohibitae: The Anglo-Ottoman Trade in War Materials and the Dependence Theory". Oriente Moderno. Anno XX (81) (1): 177–92. doi:10.1163/22138617-08101009. JSTOR 25817751.
- Ágoston, Gábor (2005). Guns for the Sultan: Military Power and the Weapons Industry in the Ottoman Empire. Cambridge, U.K.: Cambridge University Press. ISBN 978-0-521-84313-3.
- Andrade, Tonio (2016), The Gunpowder Age: China, Military Innovation, and the Rise of the West in World History, Princeton University Press, ISBN 978-0-691-13597-7.
- Burke, Edmund III (May 1979). "Islamic History as World History: Marshall Hodgson, 'The Venture of Islam'". International Journal of Middle East Studies. 10 (2): 241–64. doi:10.1017/s0020743800034796. JSTOR 162129. S2CID 162891110.
- Chase, Kenneth (2003), Firearms: A Global History to 1700, Cambridge University Press, ISBN 0-521-82274-2.
- Har-El, Shai (1995). Struggle for Domination in the Middle East: The Ottoman-Mamluk War, 1485-91. Leiden: E.J. Brill. ISBN 978-90-04-10180-7.
- Hess, Andrew Christie (January 1985). "Islamic Civilization and the Legend of Political Failure". Journal of Near Eastern Studies. 44 (1): 27–39. doi:10.1086/373102. JSTOR 544368. S2CID 154847344.
- Hodgson, Marshall G. S. (1974). The Venture of Islam: Conscience and History in a World Civilization'. Chicago: University of Chicago Press. ISBN 978-0-226-34677-9.
- Khan, Iqtidar Alam (March–April 2005). "Gunpowder and Empire: Indian Case". Social Scientist. 33 (3/4): 54–65. JSTOR 3518112.
- Khan, Iqtidar Alam (2004). Gunpowder and Firearms: Warfare in Medieval India. New Delhi: Oxford University Press. ISBN 978-0-19-566526-0.
- Lane, Kris E. (2010). Colour of Paradise: The Emerald in the Age of Gunpowder Empires. New Haven, Connecticut: Yale University Press. ISBN 978-0-300-16131-1.
- Matthee, Rudi (December 15, 1999). "Firearms". Encyclopædia Iranica. (Updated as of January 26, 2012.)
- Matthee, Rudi (2010). "Was Safavid Iran an Empire?". Journal of the Economic and Social History of the Orient. 53 (1/2): 233–65. doi:10.1163/002249910x12573963244449. JSTOR 25651218.
- McNeill, William H. (1993). "The Age of Gunpowder Empires, 1450-1800". In Adas, Michael (ed.). Islamic & European Expansion: The Forging of a Global Order. Philadelphia: Temple University Press. pp. 103–139. ISBN 978-1-56639-068-2.
- Mikaberidze, Alexander (2011). "Jam, Battle of (1528)". In Mikaberidze, Alexander (ed.). Conflict and Conquest in the Islamic World: A Historical Encyclopedia. Vol. 1. Santa Barbara, Calif.: ABC-CLIO. pp. 442–43. ISBN 978-1-59884-336-1.
- Needham, Joseph (1986), Science & Civilisation in China, vol. V:7: The Gunpowder Epic, Cambridge University Press, ISBN 0-521-30358-3.
- Pagaza, Ignacio; Argyriades, Demetrios (2009). Winning the Needed Change: Saving Our Planet Earth. IOS Press. p. 129. ISBN 978-1-58603-958-5.
- Roth Li, Gertraude (2002). "State Building Before 1644". In Peterson, Willard J. (ed.). The Cambridge History of China, Volume 9: The Ch'ing Empire to 1800, Part One. Cambridge: Cambridge University Press. pp. 9–72. ISBN 978-0-521-24334-6..
- Streusand, Douglas E. (2011). Islamic Gunpowder Empires: Ottomans, Safavids, and Mughals. Philadelphia: Westview Press. ISBN 978-0-8133-1359-7.
- Sun, Laichen (October 2003). "Military Technology Transfers from Ming China and the Emergence of Northern Mainland Southeast Asia (c. 1390-1527)". Journal of Southeast Asian Studies. 34 (3): 495–517. doi:10.1017/s0022463403000456. JSTOR 20072535. S2CID 162422482.
