= Mirim Çelebi =

Ottoman astronomer

Personal life
- Died: Edirne
- Era: Ottoman era
- Region: Turkey
- Main interest(s): Fiqh (Islamic jurisprudence), Falkiat, Mathematics, Optics
- Occupation: Judge, teacher

Religious life
- Religion: Islam
- Denomination: Sunni
- Jurisprudence: Hanafi
- Creed: Maturidi

Muslim leader
- Influenced by: Ali Qushji

Mirim Çelebi was a 16th-century Ottoman astronomer. Çelebi was a title meaning "intellectual".

== Biography ==
Mirim Çelebi was born in Constantinople. His father Kutbiddin Muhammed was the grandson of the famous Ottoman astronomer Ali Kuşçu (1403–1474). After the death of his father, he was trained by his maternal grandfather. He served in the madrasas of Gelibolu, Edirne, Bursa and finally Constantinople as a scholar (Turkish: müderris). Sultan Bayazıt II (reigned 1481–1512) invited him to the palace as a mathematics teacher.

He was also an expert of Islamic Law. During the reign of Selim I (r. 1512–1520), he briefly served as Anatolian kazasker, a high-ranked judge. In 1519, he retired and spent the rest of his life in Edirne. Mirim Çelebi died in Edirne, and was laid to rest in the graveyard of Evliya Kasim Pasha Mosque.

His main book was on optics.
