= Ulugh Beg Observatory =

Observatory in Samarkand, Uzbekistan

Coordinates: 39°40′30″N 67°0′18″E

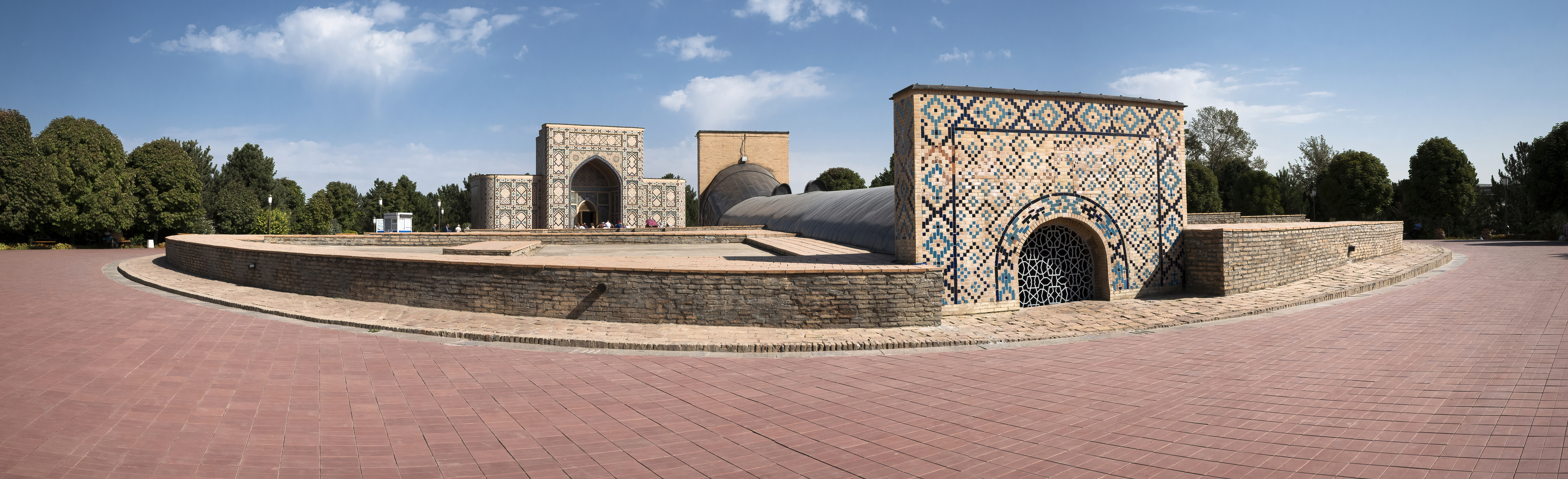
Ulugh Beg Observatory in 2025

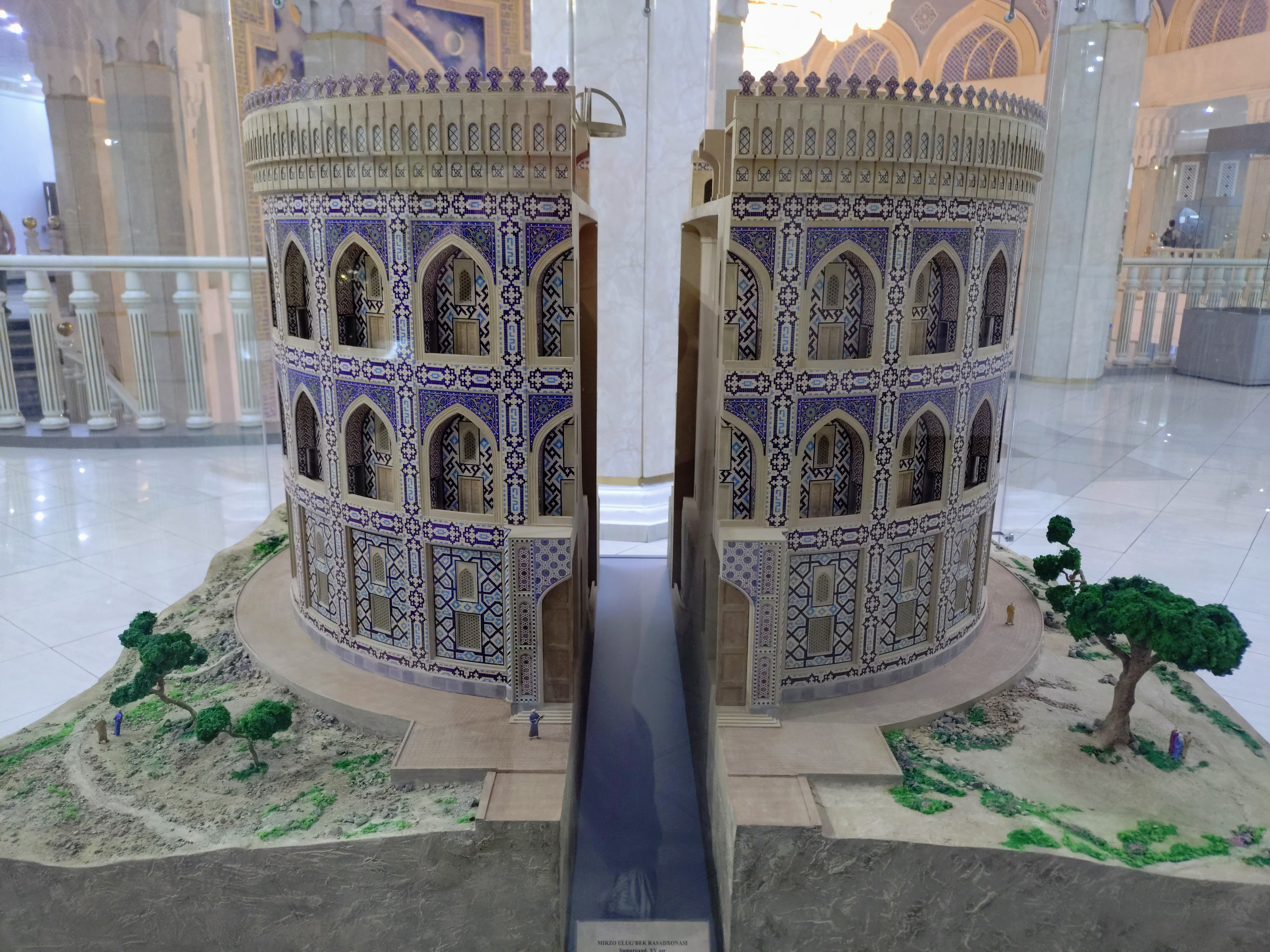
A model of Ulugh Beg Observatory in the Uzbek National Museum; the central partition hosted the huge sextant.

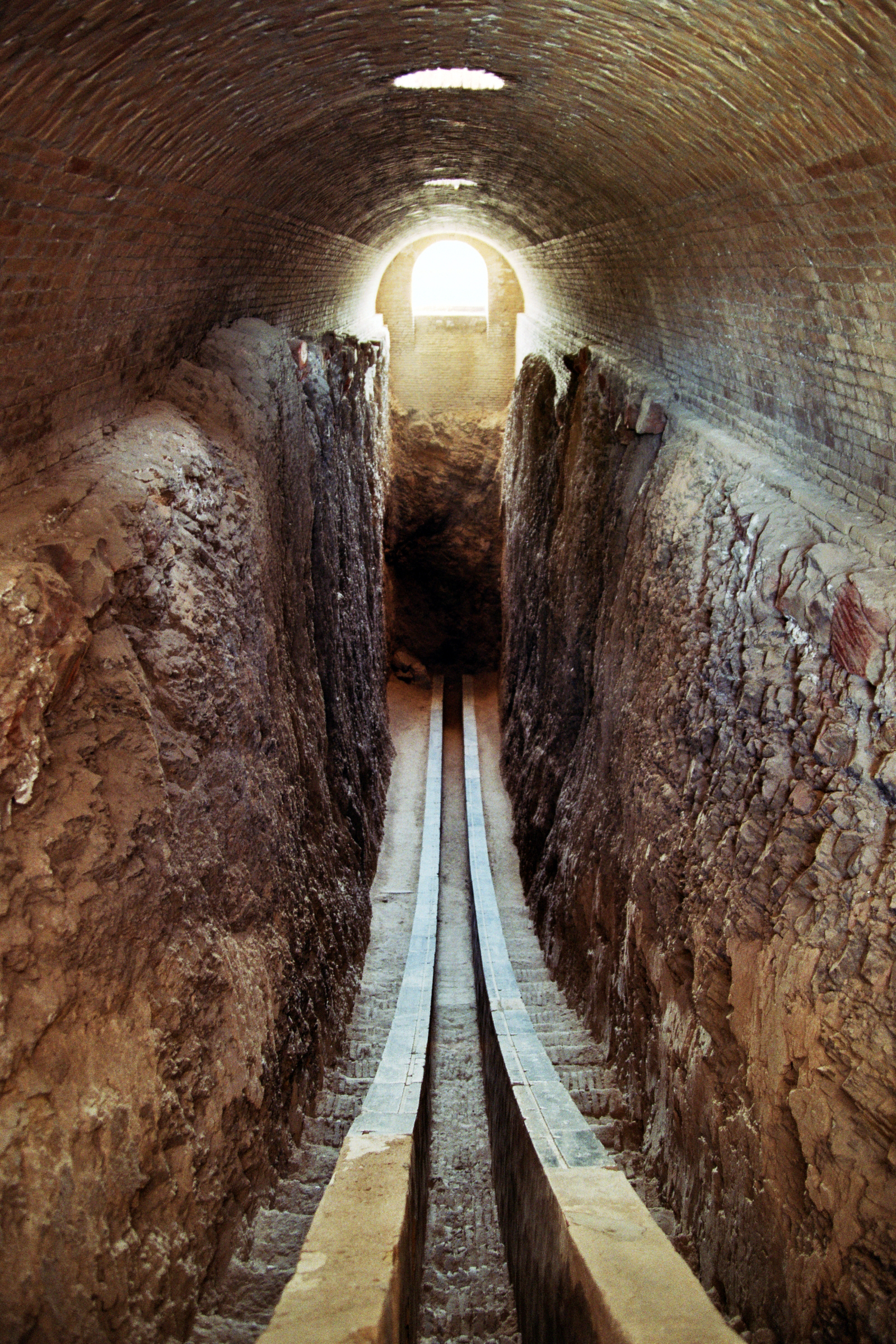
The trench with the lower section of the meridian arc. In Ulugh Beg's time, these walls were lined with polished marble. It was part of a huge sextant.

The Ulugh Beg Observatory is an observatory in modern day Samarkand, Uzbekistan, which was built in the 1420s by the Timurid astronomer Ulugh Beg. This school of astronomy was constructed under the Timurid Empire, and was the last of its kind from the Islamic Medieval period. Islamic astronomers who worked at the observatory include Jamshid al-Kashi, Ali Qushji, and Ulugh Beg himself. The observatory was destroyed in 1449 and rediscovered in 1908.

== History ==
=== Rise and decline ===
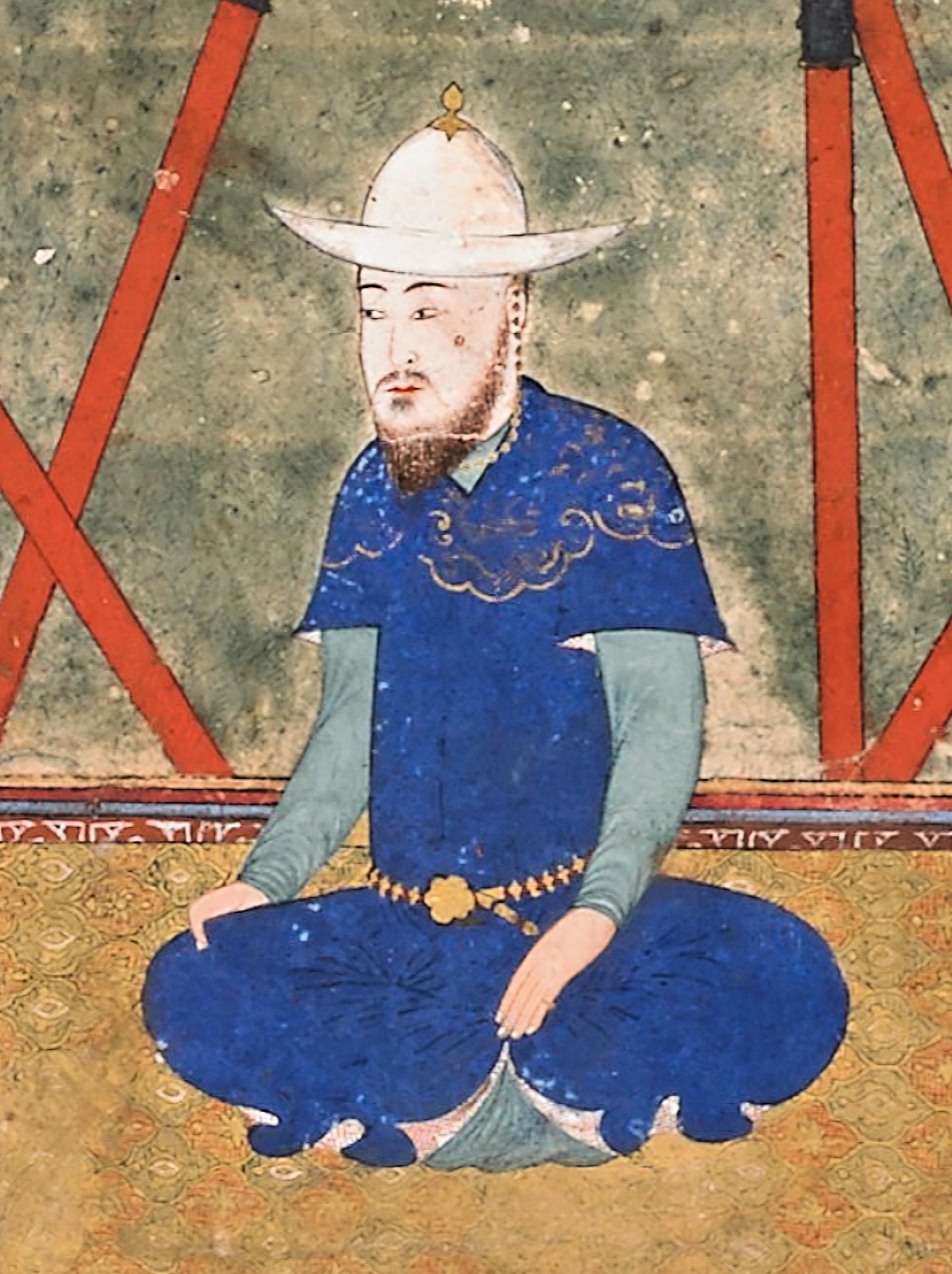
Ulugh Beg, founder of the observatory, in a contemporary Timurid painting (1425-1450)

Ulugh Beg, the son of Shah Rukh and grandson of Amir Timur, became the ruler of Samarkand in the 15th century AD. Ulugh Beg was very skilled in mathematics and astronomy. He taught many important astronomers, including Ali Qushji.

Many historians have tried to accurately identify the dates of the events that occurred during the Samarkand or Ulugh Beg Observatory. The differences in interpreting dates and citations of historical sources have caused inaccuracies and neglect of some events during this time.

In Jamshid al-Kashi's letters to Ulugh Beg's father, you can see Ulugh Beg's visit to the Maragha Observatory had an effect on Ulugh Beg. This could have affected Ulugh Beg's reason for his transformation of the city of Samarkand and his mathematical orientation. Other matters such as political, economic, military, social, and even commercial reasons could have played a role in the building of Ulugh Beg's observatory. Another reason of starting his own observatory could have been because of Ulugh Beg's differences in observations of those with al-Sūfī.

The foundation for Ulugh Beg Observatory was laid in the earlier half of the 1420s (823 AH). Although the year of its completion is still debated, the observatory was completed around 1428 AD (831 AH). Many Old Persian texts reference the Samarkand Observatory and Ulugh Beg.

He invited skillful mathematicians and astronomers to help build this observatory and also a madrassa in Samarkand. Among those he invited were Ghīyāth al-Dīn Jamshid al-Kashi, Mu’in al-Din al-Kashi, Salah al-Din Qadi Zada Rumi, and Ali Qushiji. Over 60 mathematicians and astronomers were invited to the observatory. Jamshīd al-Kāshī was appointed as the first director of the observatory. After al-Kashi's death, Qadi Zada became the director of the observatory. After the death of Qadi Zada, Qushji led the observatory as the last and final director. The Samarkand Observatory was a place for astronomers and mathematician to work together in finding new discoveries.

Ulugh Beg's observatory was built according to the plans of the Maragha observatory, which was designed by Nasir al-din al-Tusi. Ulugh Beg's observatory included the largest quadrant principle device. The building was not tall but was allowed a maximal size for the arc of the circle. This device was carefully oriented, and the arc was scaled very accurately. This device was very versatile. It could accurately measure the sun from the horizon, the altitude of a star and other planets. The duration of the year, period of planets, and eclipses were measured by this device. Ulugh Beg's measurements of planets closely relate to today's measurement, showing us the phenomenal accuracy of the device.

Today, the foundations and the buried part of the marble quadrant are all that are visible of the original vestiges of the Ulugh Beg Observatory. Much of the decline of the observatory has been attributed to Ulugh Beg's assassination by his son, Abd al Latif, around 1449 (852 AH). Ulugh Beg's death caused chaos within the observatory. The observatory was destroyed and dozens of talented astronomers and mathematicians were driven away. In 1908, the Russian archaeologist Vassily Vyatkin uncovered the remains of the observatory.

=== Scientific atmosphere ===
Jamshid Al-Kashi, a 15th-century astronomer and mathematician, is known to have relocated to Samarkand to interact with the scientific processes taking place there. Having received an invitation from Ulugh Beg, Al-Kashi left his native land of Kashan in north central Iran and went to Samarkand. A letter that Al-Kashi wrote to his father during his stay in Samarkand has been translated by Kennedy (1960) and Sayılı (1960). This letter, written in Persian, has shaped the modern view of Samarkand activities substantially despite its lack of information about scientific activities that were taking place at the observatory. However, a new letter written by Al-Kashi to his father has been found in Iran, and the translation of this letter by Bagheri sheds more light on the scientific atmosphere of Samarkand in particular and reduces the ambiguity of certain elements in the first letter by virtue of their overlapping parts.

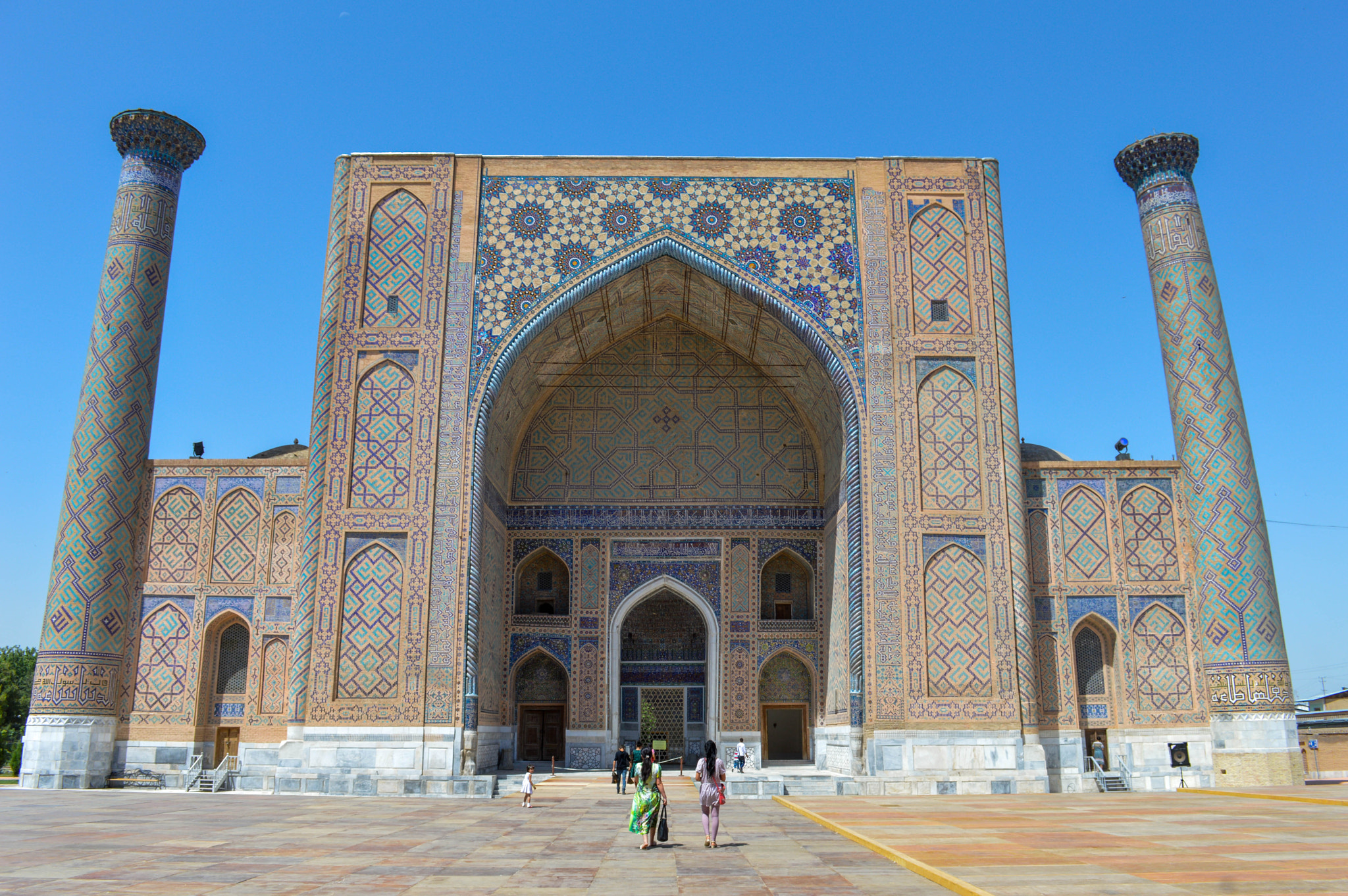
Ulugh Beg Madrasah was an important centre of astronomical study in Central Asia

In the letter, Al-Kashi describes a problem about astrology that he discussed with his colleagues. The translation, ‘‘[Let us suppose that] the Sun is, e.g., in 10 degrees of Aquarius, with a certain altitude, and the ascendent of time is a certain degree [of the ecliptic]; then [the ascendent of the time when] its [i.e., the Sun's] altitude [is the maximum altitude of the ecliptic at that moment] is a quadrant [in advance of the Sun's position], i.e., in 10 degrees (20) of Taurus", reveals that perhaps Samarkand's scientific atmosphere was more geared towards astrology than previously believed given Krisciunas's paper on the “Legacy of Ulugh Beg” where astrology has an extremely limited discussion. Astrology, only mentioned once in passing in Krisciunas's paper on the scientific atmosphere of Ulugh Beg, was perhaps a more integrated element of the scientific discourse in the Samarkand world given the new, aforementioned letter.

Per the letter of Al-Kashi to his father, an innovation was created with Ulugh Beg. The Fakhrı sextant, stood on top of a rock into which some of it was carved, so the edifice would not be tall given the soft bricks of the area. Al-Kashi compares this to Maragha, saying that the sextant is positioned higher there but also notes the flat roof present in Samarkand should facilitate scientific improvement given the fact that “instruments may be placed on it”. This information, about the sextants in Maragha is contradictory to other sources that state there were no sextants at Maragha. This contradiction was revealed by the translation.

Moreover, the scientific atmosphere of Samarkand was one of general isolation because Al-Kashi describes the stout adherence to Ptolemy's methodologies and lack of awareness for happenings of the Maragha observatory. The lack of awareness and strict adherence to prior methods by Ulugh Beg himself reveals the perhaps provincial nature of their studies. However, this perceived closed-mindedness was alleviated by the increasing diversity of scientists and students that were invited to the observatory. An evaluation of the errors made in Ptolemy at Samarkand by Shevchenko further confirms the effects of Samarkand's initial isolated nature.

According to Bageri's translation of Al-Kashi's letter, a lot of teaching was going on there strictly from memory by teachers who had learned from astronomers in Herat. Moreover, at the time Al-Kashi wrote the letter, three of the teachers were well versed in Islamic jurisprudence: Qazızada, Maulana Muhammad Khanı, and Maulana Abu’l-Fath. The letter also states that Ulugh Beg did not show up to teach class often.

Maulana Abu’l-Fath stated that he was intellectually underneath Maulana Muhammad Khanı, who was only occasionally present in the court meetings or observatory meetings, and Qazızada, who was always practicing his craft. "To do them justice, [I must admit that] (30) when there is a discussion in their meeting, I dare not intervene, all the more so because His Majesty knows this art well and [therefore] one cannot impudently claim competence."

Ulugh Beg fostered an environment with some of the best astronomers of the time, and they all observed and calculated the positions of thousands of stars. Ulugh Beg's main work was the Zij-i Sultani. Written in 1437, this work was in Persian, and it was also greatly influenced by Nasir al-Din Tusi.

One of the scientists with whom Jamshid al-Kashi would study was Yusuf H. allaj, who had prior experiences in Herat, Egypt, Syria, Anatolia, and adjacent regions. Yusuf H. allaj was the son of Maulana H. allaj’, who also resided in Samarkand at the same time Al-Kashi was there.

Ulugh Beg was surrounded with other Islamic astronomers such as Ali Qushji.

It is also noted that music was studied and taught at the observatory. Prosody, music and mathematics seemed to foster the curiosities of the scientists there at the time. However, in the letter by Al-Kashi, he noted that despite his curiosity about music and math, he was urged to focus on his tasks at hand.

== Modifications and architecture ==
The architecture of Ulugh Beg's observatory was different from the others built around that time. Ulugh Beg needed a skilled architect to help him, so he contacted Qazizada-I Rumi and asked him to find an experienced and skilled architect. Qazizada-I Rumi recommended Kashani, a mathematician and architect. Hulagu Khan and Mangu Khan conceived of modeling the observatory after the Maragheh observatory; they hired Nasir al-Din al-Tusi to head construction. Ulugh Beg's observatory was built on a hill 21 meters above the ground. The observatory has a cylindrical-shaped building with a diameter of 46 meters and a height of 30 to 33 meters, the sextant was in the middle of this cylinder. The building was made of brick, which was readily available but not particularly stable. The radius of the sextant was 40.04 meters, which made it the largest astronomical instrument in the world at the time. With this radius, the height of the building would have been too tall, potentially falling in on itself. This problem was solved by constructing part of the sextant underground, in a ditch roughly 2 meters wide. This allowed the size of the sextant to be maintained without the height being dangerously tall.

The Fakhrı sextant had 70.2 cm divisions which represented one degree. There were also marks every 11.7mm to show one minute and 1mm marks that represented five seconds. These markings turned out to be extremely accurate, matching up closely to the calculations found today. The observatory was made up of three stories, the first story was for the staff to live in. All observations were made from the second and third stories, which had many arches to look through. The roof of the observatory was flat, allowing instruments to be utilized on top of the building.

The entrance of the observatory has been modified several times in recent years. This is primarily for aesthetic reasons and is not to improve the observatory's accuracy.

== Zij-i Sultani ==
Zīj-i Sulṭānī (Persian: زیجِ سلطانی) is a Zij astronomical table and star catalogue that was published by Ulugh Beg in 1437.

A Zij is an astronomical table made up of numerical tables and explanations. It provides sufficient information to allow measurement of time and computation of planet and star positions. The Zij may also contain the proof for the math and theories contained in the tables.

Ulugh Beg's Zij-I Sultani was published in 1437, it was written in Persian, and listed around 1,000 stars. It follows Ptolemaic work and does not suggest any changes in the planetary model. It has also been called Zij-I Ulugh Beg, Zij-I Jadid-I Sultani, and Zaij-I Gurgani. It is thought that he may have been influenced to create his Zij by Nasir al-Din Tusi, who had written 150 books. Ulugh Beg's star catalog was the first to have been published since the Almagest written by Ptolemy. The Zij-I Sultani includes the stars explained in the Almagest, but has more accurate numbers accompanying them. The primary instrument used to obtain the information in the Zij-I Sultani came from Ulugh Beg's observatory quadrant. He did not work alone, he was assisted by his students and other Muslim astronomers including Jamshid al-Kashi and Ali Qushji. It took 17 years to compile the full list of stars, they began in 1420 when Ulugh Beg was 26 years old and they finished in 1437. One of the most significant parts of the Zij-I Sultani is Ulugh Beg's sine table. The table is 18 pages long and has values of sine to nine decimal places for every degree from zero to 87, it also contains the value of sine to 11 decimal places from 87 to 90 degrees. The Zij was influential and was continuously used until the 19th century and hundreds of copies of the original Persian manuscript exist around the world. It has also been translated into many languages including Arabic, Turkish, and Hebrew. Commentaries by known astronomers like Quishji have also been made.

Ulugh Beg determined the length of the tropical year as 365^{d} 5^{h} 49^{m} 15^{s}, which has an error of +25^{s}, making it more accurate than Nicolaus Copernicus' estimate which had an error of +30^{s}. Ulugh Beg also determined the Earth's axial tilt as 23;30,17 degrees in sexagesimal notation, which in decimal notation converts to 23.5047 degrees.

== Museum ==
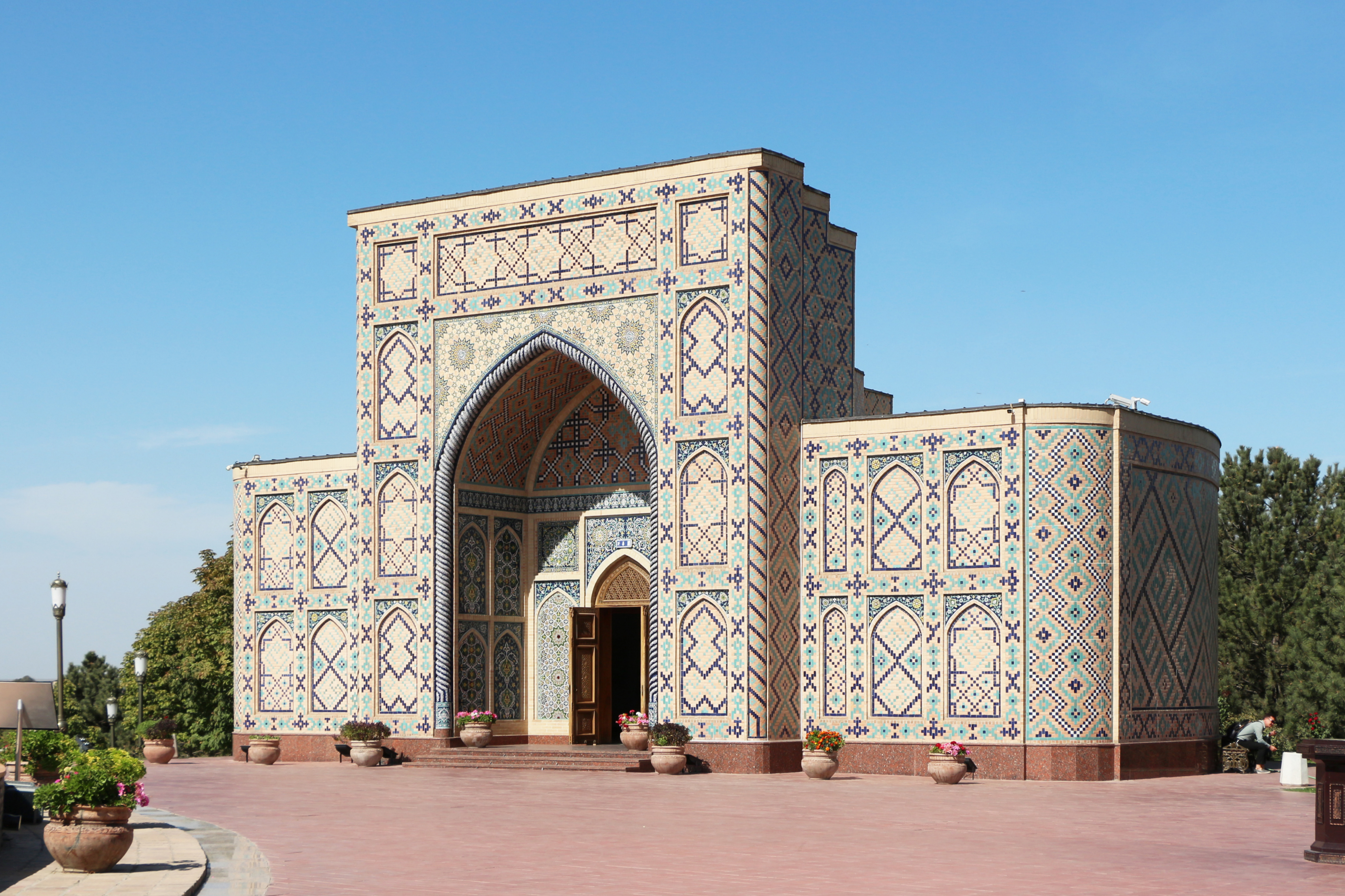
Ulugh Beg Observatory Museum

The Ulug Beg Observatory Museum was built in 1970 to commemorate Ulugh Beg. The museum contains reproductions of the Arabic manuscripts Ulug Beg's star charts, the Zij-i Sultani, and of important European printed editions of Ulugh Beg's work. It also contains astrolabes and other instruments as well as a miniature reconstruction of the observatory itself.
