= Zij-i Sultani =

Astrological book of medieval Islam

Zīj-i Sulṭānī (Persian: زیجِ سلطانی) is a Zij astronomical table and star catalogue that was published by Ulugh Beg in 1438–1439. It was the joint product of the work of a group of Muslim astronomers working under the patronage of Ulugh Beg at Samarkand's Ulugh Beg Observatory. These astronomers included Jamshid al-Kashi and Ali Qushji, among others.

The Zij-i-Sultani was not surpassed in accuracy until the work of Taqi ad-Din and Tycho Brahe in the 16th century.

The serious errors which Ulugh Beg found in previous Zij star catalogues (many of the earlier ones were simply updates on Ptolemy's work, adding the effect of precession to the longitudes) induced him to redetermine the positions of 992 fixed stars, to which he added 27 stars from al-Sufi's Book of Fixed Stars (964), which were too far south for observation from Samarkand. This catalogue, one of the most original of the Middle Ages, was edited by Thomas Hyde at Oxford in 1665 under the title Jadāvil-i Mavāzi' S̱avābit, sive, Tabulae Long. ac Lat. Stellarum Fixarum ex Observatione Ulugh Beighi, by Gregory Sharpe in 1767, and in 1843 by Francis Baily in Vol. XIII of the Memoirs of the Royal Astronomical Society.

In 1437, Ulugh Beg determined the length of the sidereal year as 365.2570370...^{d} = 365^{d} 6^{h} 10^{m} 8^{s} (an error of +58^{s}). In his measurements over many years he used a 50 m high gnomon. This value was improved by 28^{s}, 88 years later in 1525 by Nicolaus Copernicus (1473–1543), who appealed to the estimation of Thābit ibn Qurra (826–901), which was accurate to +2^{s}. However, Ulugh Beg later measured another more precise value as 365^{d} 6^{h} 9^{m} 35^{s}, which has an error of +25^{s}, making it more accurate than Copernicus' estimate which had an error of +30^{s}. Ulugh Beg also determined the Earth's axial tilt as 23°30'17" degrees in sexagesimal notation, which in decimal notation converts to 23.5047 degrees.

== See also ==
- Zij
- Ulugh Beg Observatory
