= Revolt of Abdal-Latif Mirza =

Battle of the Timurid Civil Wars

- Part of Timurid Civil Wars
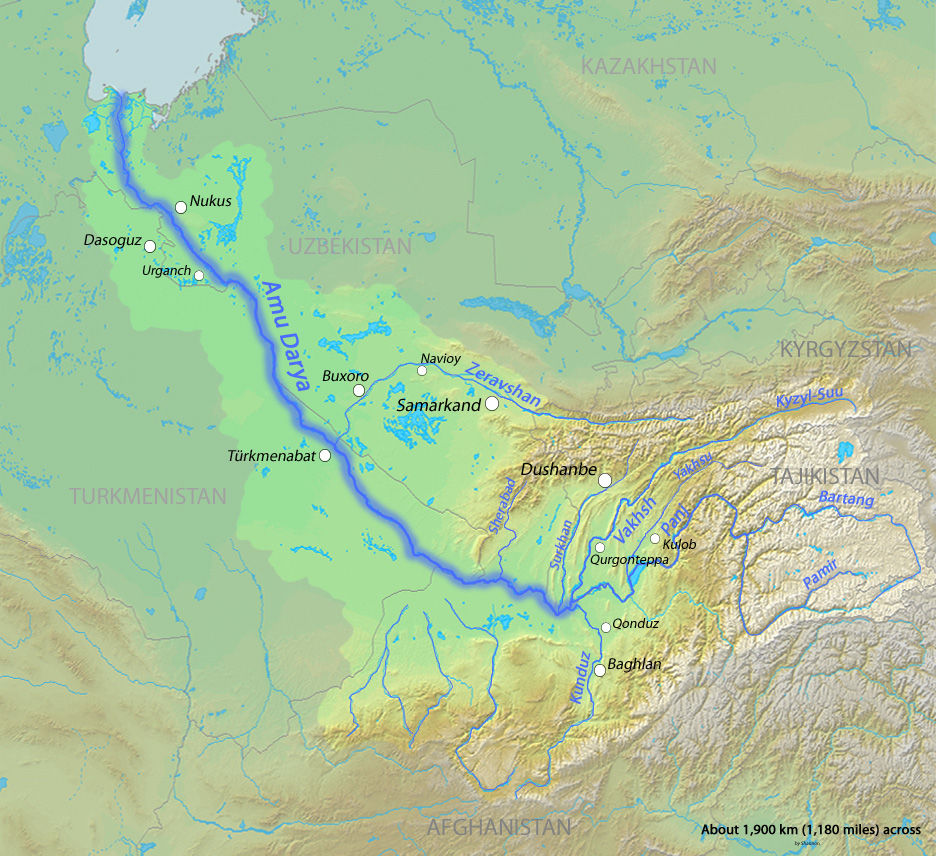
- Amu Darya
Date	1449
Location	Amu Darya
Result	Tactical Stalemate; Later Strategic Victory for Abdal-Latif Mirza after withdrawal of Ulugh Beg to Samarkand

Belligerents
Timurids of Balkh	Timurids of Samarkand

Commanders and leaders
Abdal-Latif Mirza	Ulugh Beg; Abdallah Mirza (POW)

It is not clear what led Abdal-Latif Mirza to revolt against his father Ulugh Beg in 1449 C.E. Many theories abound; one being that he was raised by Gawhar Shad in Herat and not by his father Ulugh Beg who was governor of Samarkand during the reign of Shah Rukh, therefore Abdal-Latif Mirza was not attached to his father. Ulugh Beg on the other hand preferred his second son Abdal-Aziz Mirza to be his heir, whom he had raised himself and groomed to take over. Another reason was that when the Baysonqor brothers invaded Khurasan, Ulugh Beg left his son Abdal-Latif Mirza, to deal with a difficult situation making it look as if it were his failures that led to the loss of Khurasan; this Abdal-Latif Mirza resented deeply. And finally, during a revolt in Balkh in Spring of 1449 by a certain Miranshah, which was crushed by Abdal-Latif Mirza, was discovered a letter from Ulugh Beg to this Miranshah ordering him to instigate the revolt. This story is not corroborated by any other source than Mirkhond but is given as a last excuse for all out war with his father. The real reason of this revolt may never be fully understood but Abdal-Latif Mirza marched in haste towards Samarkand after abolishing the state taxes on trade through Balkh and taking over the river boats on Amu Darya.

Ulugh Beg learning of this revolt immediately prepared his forces for battle and left his son Abdal-Aziz Mirza in charge of Samarkand and took with him many Amirs especially from Arghun tribe along with Abdallah Mirza. For three months the two armies faced off on the Amu Darya with little progress but many skirmishes, almost always ending in favor of Abdal-Latif Mirza. In one such skirmish Abdallah Mirza was captured and imprisoned.

Ulugh Beg was now facing troubles in his army and at home by the actions of his son Abdal-Aziz Mirza in Samarkand who was oppressing the families of Ulugh Beg's generals. The generals were angry and there was a mutiny on his hands when he wrote a strong worded letter to his son Abdal-Aziz Mirza to cease and desist or face dire consequences of his actions.

The confrontation made little progress but finally a revolt in Bukhara and Samarkand turned Ulugh Beg's attention back to those cities. It's not clear how or why the revolt of Bukhara and Samarkand took place but what is known is that Abdal-Aziz Mirza was a bad administrator and had irritated the military establishment somehow. The Arghuns were the chief men of this group in Samarkand and the Bukhara clergy (Naqshbandi Sufis) are known to be promoters of the revolt as well. Nonetheless, they placed Abu Sa'id Mirza as their king in Samarkand and laid siege to the city. Abdal-Aziz Mirza locked himself up in the fort and sent for his father. Ulugh Beg could no longer remain on the Amu Darya and at great personal risk to himself, abandoned the field with his men and left for Samarkand.

Abdal-Latif Mirza relieved by this advantageous moment, did not follow his father or attack his rear; instead he took a cautious approach. He first resupplied his forces and took Tirmiz and Shahrisabz after crossing the Amu Darya. Ulugh Beg after dealing with the rebellion again marched against Abdal-Latif Mirza and the two armies met at Dimishq in September/October 1449.
