= Ibrahim Sultan (Timurid) =

Timurid prince (1394–1435)

- Timurid Prince
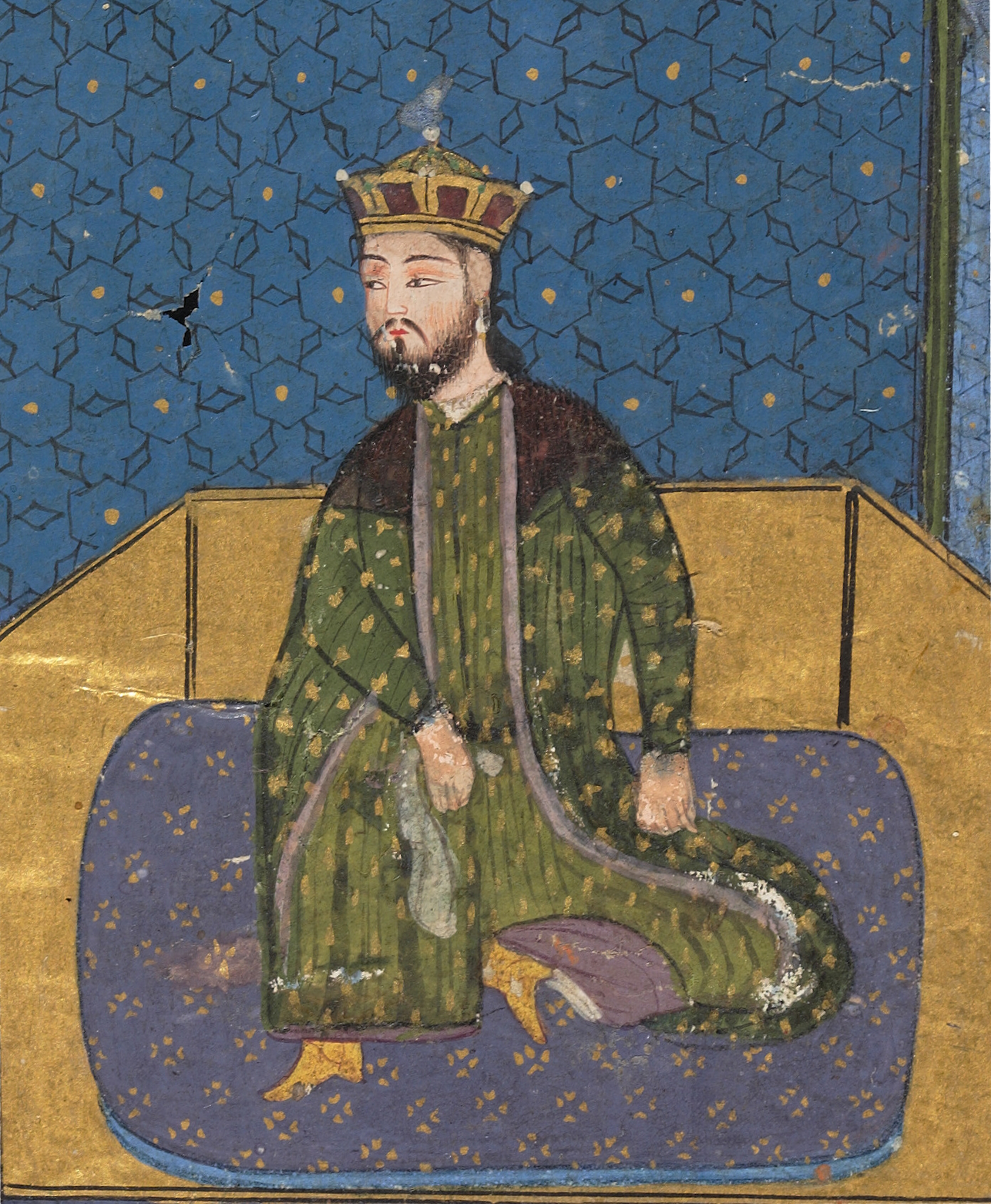
- Contemporary portrait of Ibrahim Sultan holding court in his throne-room. Shahnamah of Ibrahim Sultan Bodleian Library MS. Ouseley Add. 176 f.239b (detail).
- Born: 1394
- Died: 3 April 1435 (aged 40–41)
- Issue: Abdallah Mirza; Several others
Names
- Ibrahim Sultan Mirza
- House: House of Timur
- Father: Shah Rukh
- Religion: Islam

Ibrahim Sultan (Persian: ابراهيم سلطان بن شاهرخ; Shawwāl 796 AH/August 1394 AD – Shawwāl 838 AH/May 1435 AD) was a Timurid prince who governed a region around modern Fars from 1415 to 1435 under his father Shah Rukh. He was a grandson of the conqueror Timur and died on 3 April 1435, around twelve years before his father.

== Warfare ==
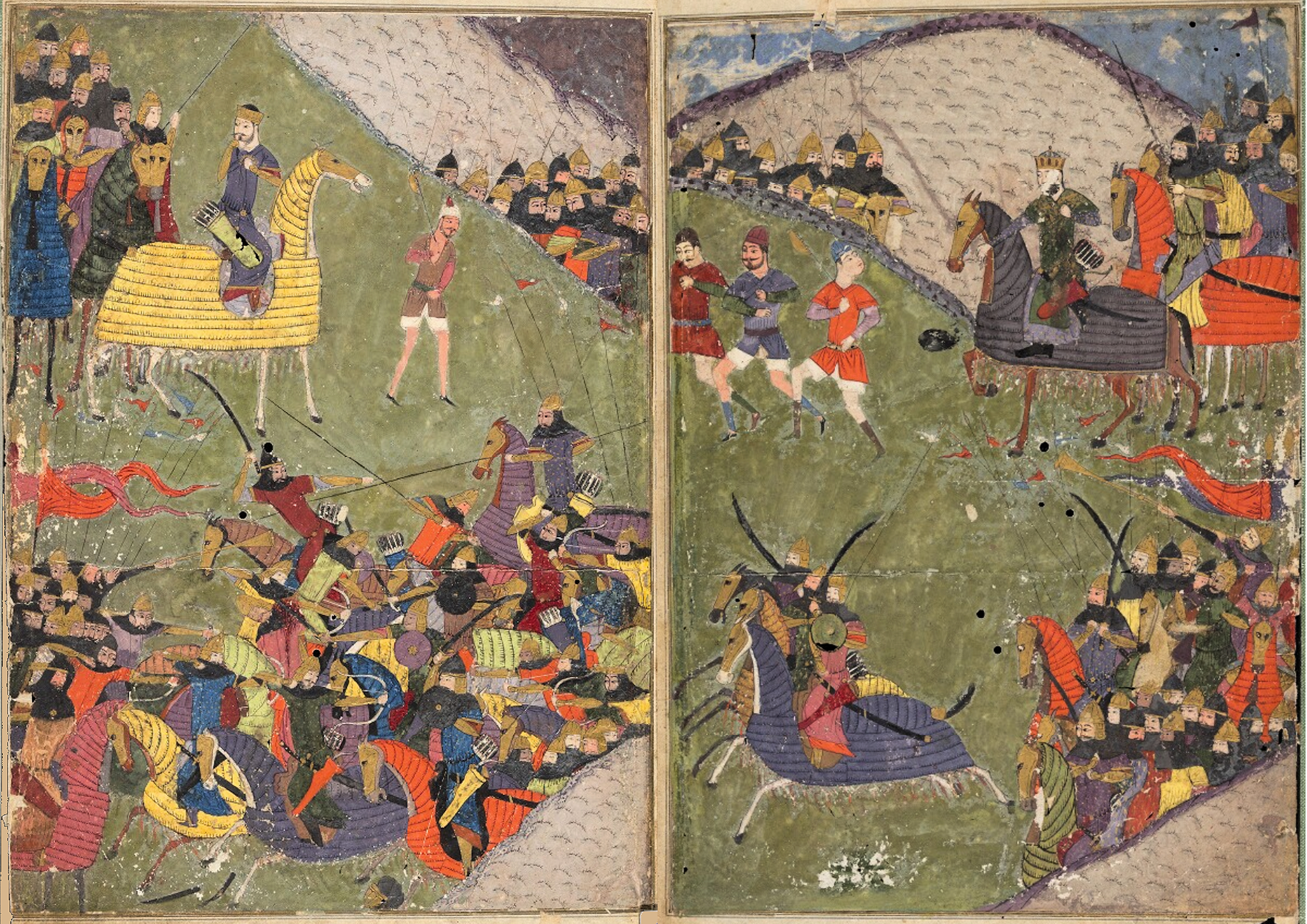
Iskander (left) in battle against Ibrahim Sultan (right) in April 1429. Shahnama (1430), Bodleian Library, ms. Add 176, folios 6r-7v.

In 1423, Ibrahim Sultan fought against the penultimate ruler of the Jalayirid dynasty, Solṭān Moḥammad, son of Šāh Valad. He managed to expel him from Shushtar, forcing him to flee to Wasit and then to al-Ḥella in southern Iraq. Solṭān Moḥammad then tried to besiege Baghdad in 1424, but failed and died in July 1424.

Ibrahim Sultan also fought directly in the campaigns of his father Shah Rukh against the Qara Qoyunlu. In particular, he faced the Qara Qoyunlu ruler Iskander in battle in 1429, where he was victorious.

== Arts ==
Ibrahim Sultan commissioned at least four illustrated manuscripts, including Sharaf al-Din Ali Yazdi's biography of Timur, a copy of Nizami's Iskandarnāma (Book of Alexander) that was completed in 1435/36, a Shāhnāma (Bodleian Library MS. Ouseley Add. 176) that was prepared between the 1420s and early 1430s, and an Anthology that was finished in 1420 and dedicated to his brother, Prince Baysunghur.

Ibrahim Sultan was an accomplished artist, avid calligrapher and great collector of books. Known to be observant in matters of religion, he personally scribed pious inscriptions on two madrasas he founded in Shiraz and at least five copies of the Qur'an. There remains a handwritten Qur'an in two volumes by him written in Naskh script. Every page of this Qur'an, finished in June 1427, has profusely decorated margins of floral scrolls in gold and color. This two-part Qur'an is a splendid example of lavish manuscript production in the early Timurid period. They were stored in a small room on top of the Qur'an Gate in Shiraz. Travelers passing underneath the gates were believed to receive the blessing of the Holy Book as they began their trip or journey from Shiraz. In 1937, the two Qur'ans were moved from the gate to the Pars Museum in Shiraz, where they remain today.

Ibrahim Sultan is also said to have repaired the Atiq Mosque but that soon thereafter it was again ruined by an earthquake.

== Personal life ==
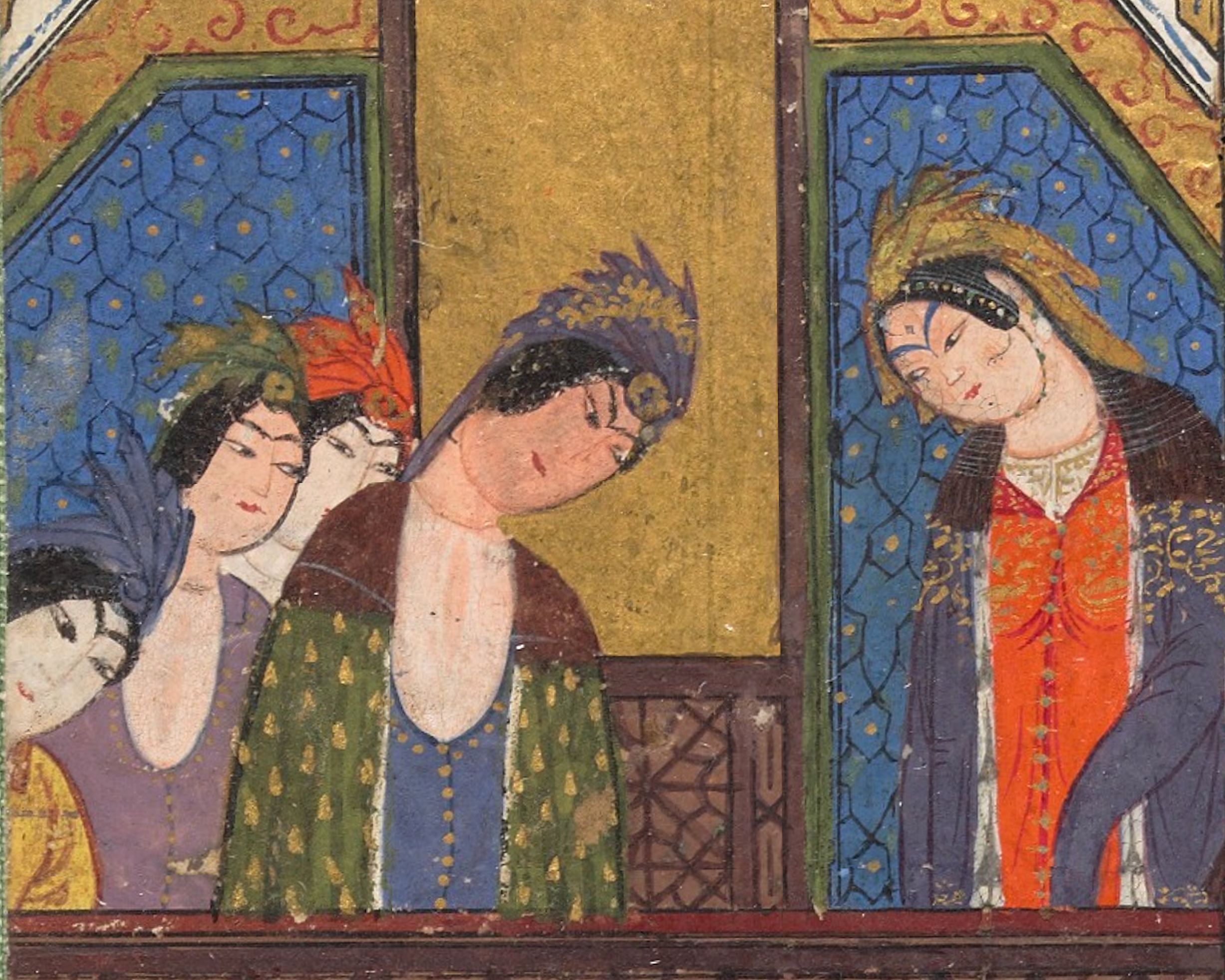
The Queen of Ibrahim Sultan (right), on a balcony with her ladies (Bodleian Library MS. Ouseley Add. 176 f.240a), painted 1430-1435.

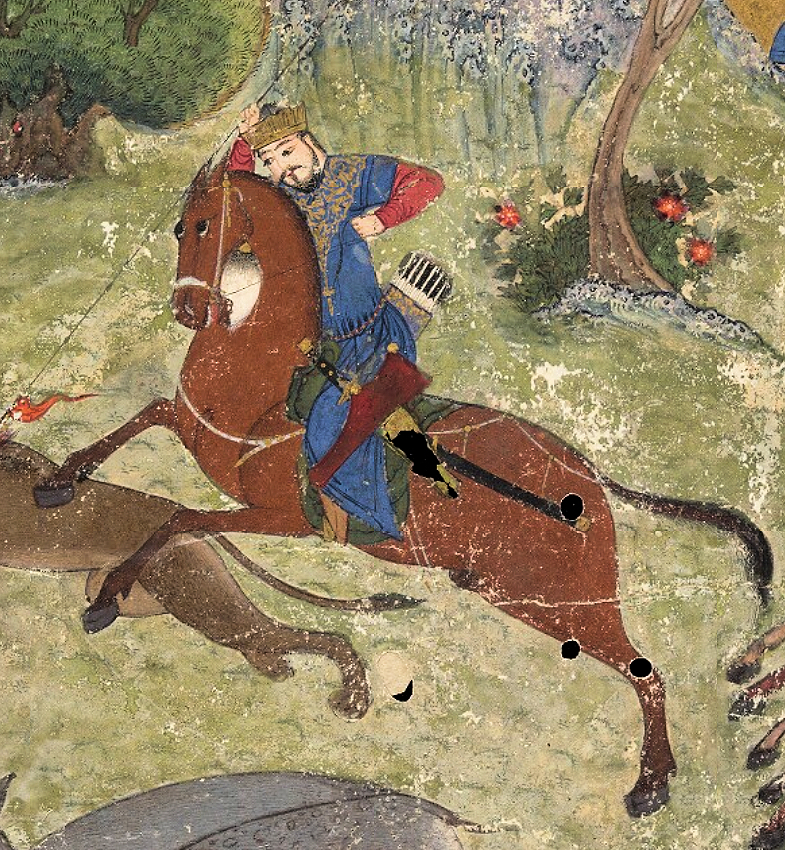
Sultan Ibrahim hunting, painted 1430–1435.

Consorts

Ibrahim had four wives:

- Mihr Sultan Agha, daughter of Alu Chuhra Sariktash;
- Fatima Sultan Agha, daughter of Amirak Qauchin;
- Jahan Begi Agha, daughter of Abdullah Taifi;
- Begi Sultan Agha, daughter of Bayazid Sywish;

Sons

Ibrahim had four sons:

- Sultan Ishaq Mirza – with Fatima Sultan Agha;
- Sultan Muhammad Mirza – with Jahan Begi Agha;
- Ismail Mirza – with Begi Sultan Agha;
- Sultan Abdallah Mirza – with Mihr Sultan Agha;

Daughters

Ibrahim had two daughters:

- Ruqaiya Begi Begum – with Mihr Sultan Agha;
- Zainab Sultan Begum – with Fatima Sultan Agha;

== See also ==
- Qur'an Gate

== Sources ==
- Jackson, Peter (2014). Jalayerids. Encyclopedia Iranica Vol. XIV, Fasc. 4. pp. 415–419.
- Uluç, Lâle (2014). "An Iskandarnāma of Nizami Produced for Ibrahim Sultan". Muqarnas Online. 30 (1): 235–253. doi:10.1163/22118993-0301P0011.
