= Ulugh Beg =

Timurid sultan, astronomer and mathematician (1394–1449)

- Mirza, Sultan
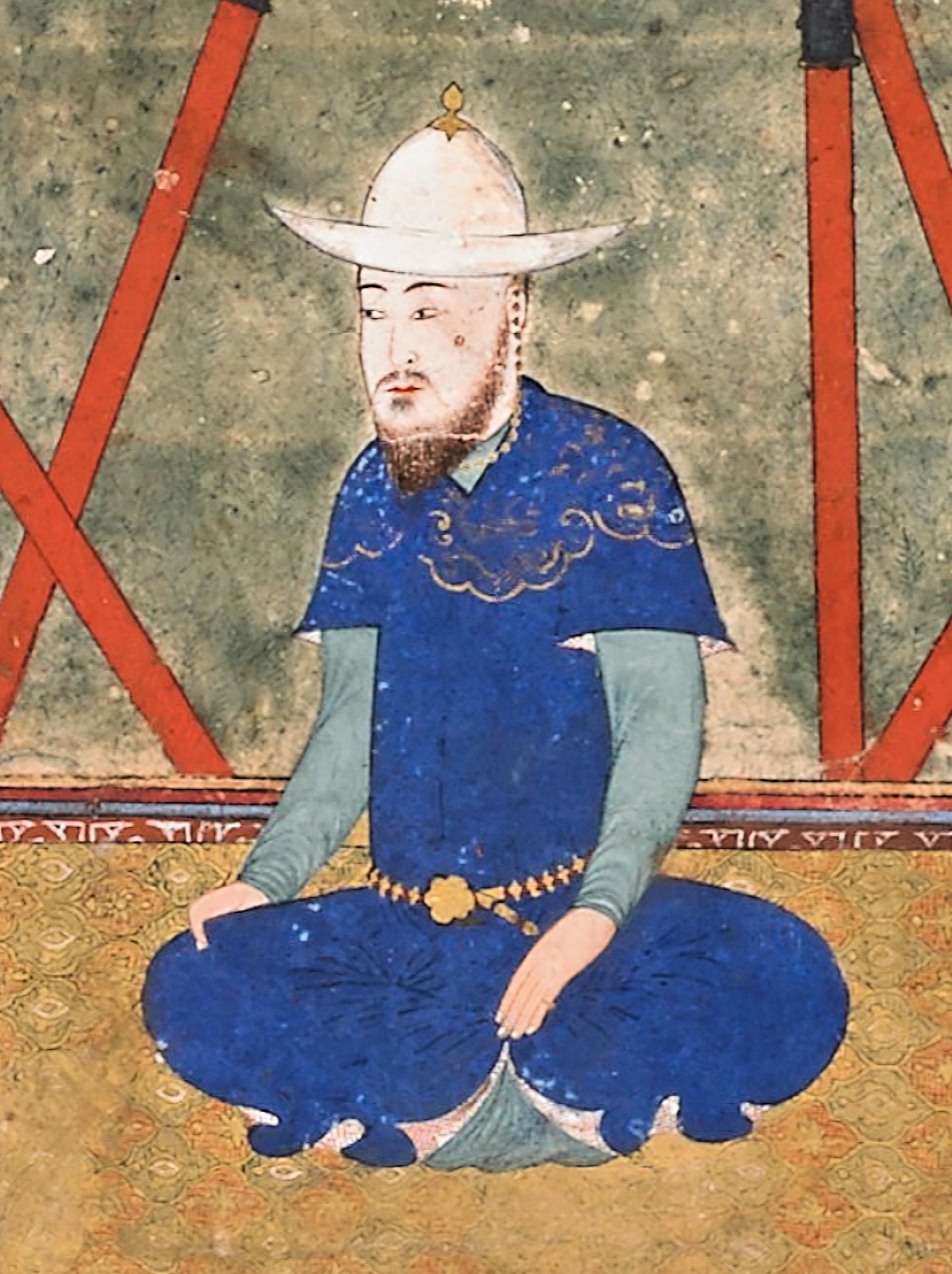
- Ulugh Beg in a contemporary Timurid painting (1425–1450). Freer Gallery of Art, Washington D.C.

Amir of the Timurid Empire
- Reign: 13 March 1447 – 27 October 1449
- Predecessor: Shah Rukh
- Successor: Abdal-Latif Mirza
- Born: Mirza Muhammad Taraghay; 22 March 1394; Sultaniyeh, Timurid Empire (now Zanjan Province, Iran)
- Died: 27 October 1449 (aged 55); Samarkand, Timurid Empire (now Samarqand Region, Uzbekistan)
- Burial: Gur-e-Amir, Samarkand
- Spouse: Aka Begi Begum; Sultan Badi al-mulk Begum; Aqi Sultan Khanika; Husn Nigar Khanika; Shukur Bi Khanika; Rukaiya Sultan Agha; Mihr Sultan Agha; Sa'adat Bakht Agha; Daulat Sultan Agha; Bakhti Bi Agha; Daulat Bakht Agha; Sultanim Agha; Sultan Malik Agha
- Issue: Abdal-Latif Mirza
- Dynasty: Timurid
- Father: Shah Rukh
- Mother: Gawhar Shad
- Religion: Islam
- Occupation: Astronomer, mathematician, political leader and ruler

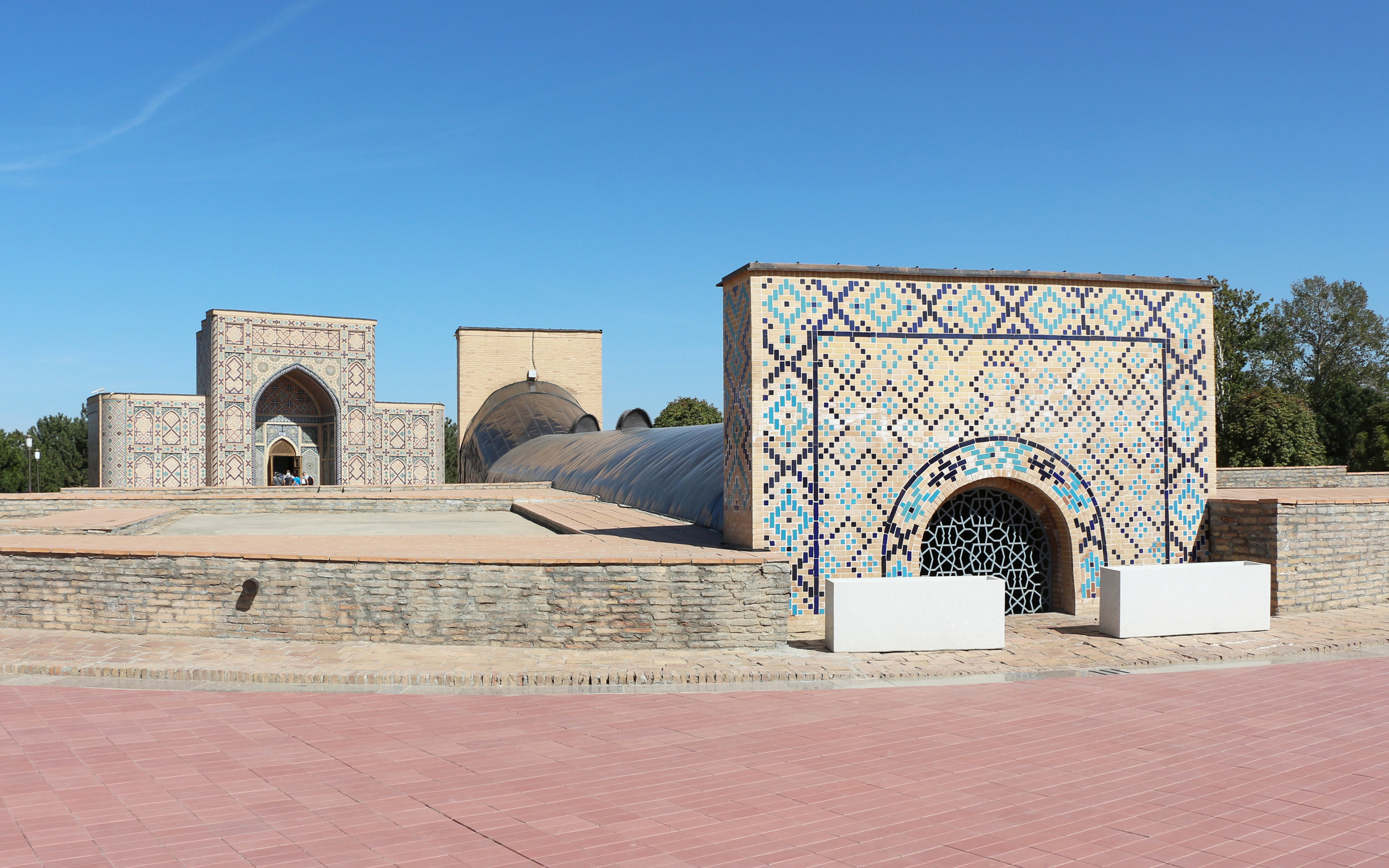
Ulugh Beg Observatory

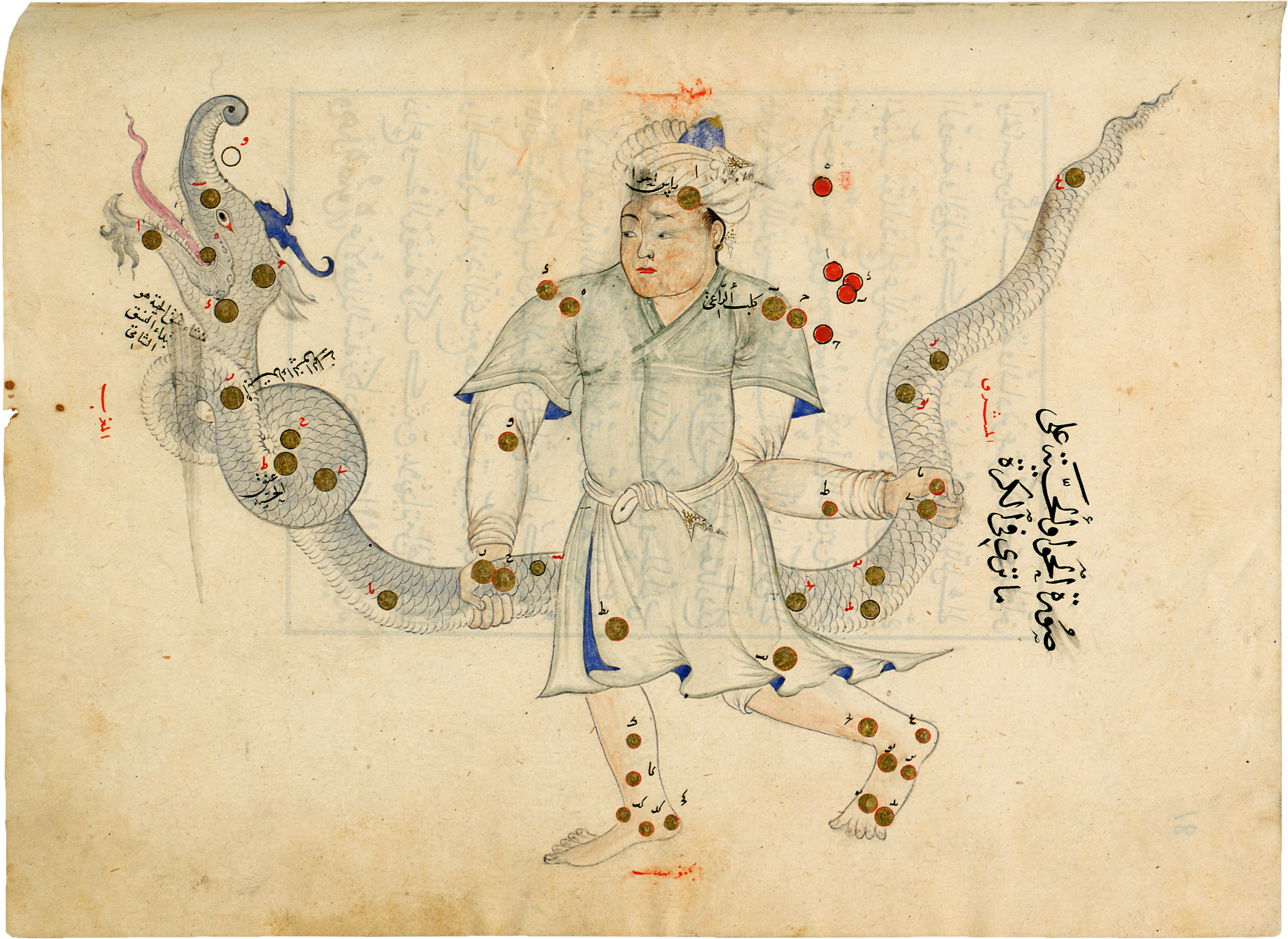
Ophiuchus, miniature from the manuscript of The Book of Fixed Stars commissioned by Ulugh Beg. Probably Samarkand, c. 1430–1440. Bibliothèque nationale de France

Mīrzā Muhammad Tarāghāy bin Shāhrukh (Chagatay: میرزا محمد تراغای بن شاهرخ; Persian: میرزا محمد طارق بن شاهرخ), better known as Ulugh Beg (Persian: الغ‌بیگ; 22 March 1394 – 27 October 1449), (Note: Ulugh or Үлэг in Cyrillic probably meant "the eldest" in Mongolian language) was a Timurid sultan, as well as an astronomer and mathematician.

Ulugh Beg was notable for his work in astronomy-related mathematics, such as trigonometry and spherical geometry, as well as his general interests in the arts and intellectual activities. It is thought that he spoke five languages: Arabic, Persian, Chaghatai Turkic, Mongolian, and a small amount of Chinese. During his rule (first as a governor, then outright) the Timurid Empire achieved the cultural peak of the Timurid Renaissance through his attention and patronage. Samarkand was captured and given to Ulugh Beg by his father Shah Rukh.

He built the great Ulugh Beg Observatory in Samarkand between 1424 and 1429. It was considered by scholars to have been one of the finest observatories in the Islamic world at the time and the largest in Central Asia. Ulugh Beg was subsequently recognized as the most important observational astronomer from the 15th century by many scholars. He also built the Ulugh Beg Madrasah (1417–1420) in Samarkand and Bukhara, transforming the cities into cultural centers of learning in Central Asia.

However, Ulugh Beg's scientific expertise was not matched by his skills in governance. During his short reign, he failed to establish his power and authority. As a result, other rulers, including his family, took advantage of his lack of control, and he was subsequently overthrown and assassinated by his son Abd al Latif around 1449 (852 AH).

== Early life ==
He was a grandson of the great conqueror and king, Timur (Tamerlane) (1336–1405), and the oldest son of Shah Rukh, both of whom came from the Turkicized Mongol Barlas tribe of Transoxiana (now Uzbekistan). His mother was a noblewoman named Gawhar Shad, daughter of a member of the representative Turkic tribal aristocracy, Ghiyasuddin Tarkhan.

Ulugh Beg was born in Sultaniyeh during his grandfather's invasion of Persia. He was given the name Mīrzā Muhammad Tāraghay. Ulugh Beg, the name he was most commonly known by, was not truly a personal name, but rather a moniker, which can be loosely translated as "Great Ruler" (compare modern Turkish ulu, "great", and bey, "chief") and is the Turkic equivalent of Timur's Perso-Arabic title Amīr-e Kabīr.

As a child he wandered through a substantial part of the Middle East and India as his grandfather expanded his conquests in those areas. After Timur's death, Shah Rukh moved the empire's capital to Herat (in modern Afghanistan). Sixteen-year-old Ulugh Beg subsequently became the governor of the former capital of Samarkand in 1409. In 1411, he was named the sovereign ruler of the whole of Mavarannahr.

== Science ==
The young ruler set out to turn the city into an intellectual center for the empire. Between 1417 and 1420, he built a madrasa ("university" or "institute") on Registan Square in Samarkand (currently in Uzbekistan), and he invited numerous Islamic astronomers and mathematicians to study there. The madrasa building still survives. Ulugh Beg's most famous pupil in astronomy was Ali Qushchi (died in 1474). Qadi Zada al-Rumi was the most notable teacher at Ulugh Beg's madrasa and Jamshid al-Kashi, an astronomer, later came to join the staff.

=== Astronomy ===
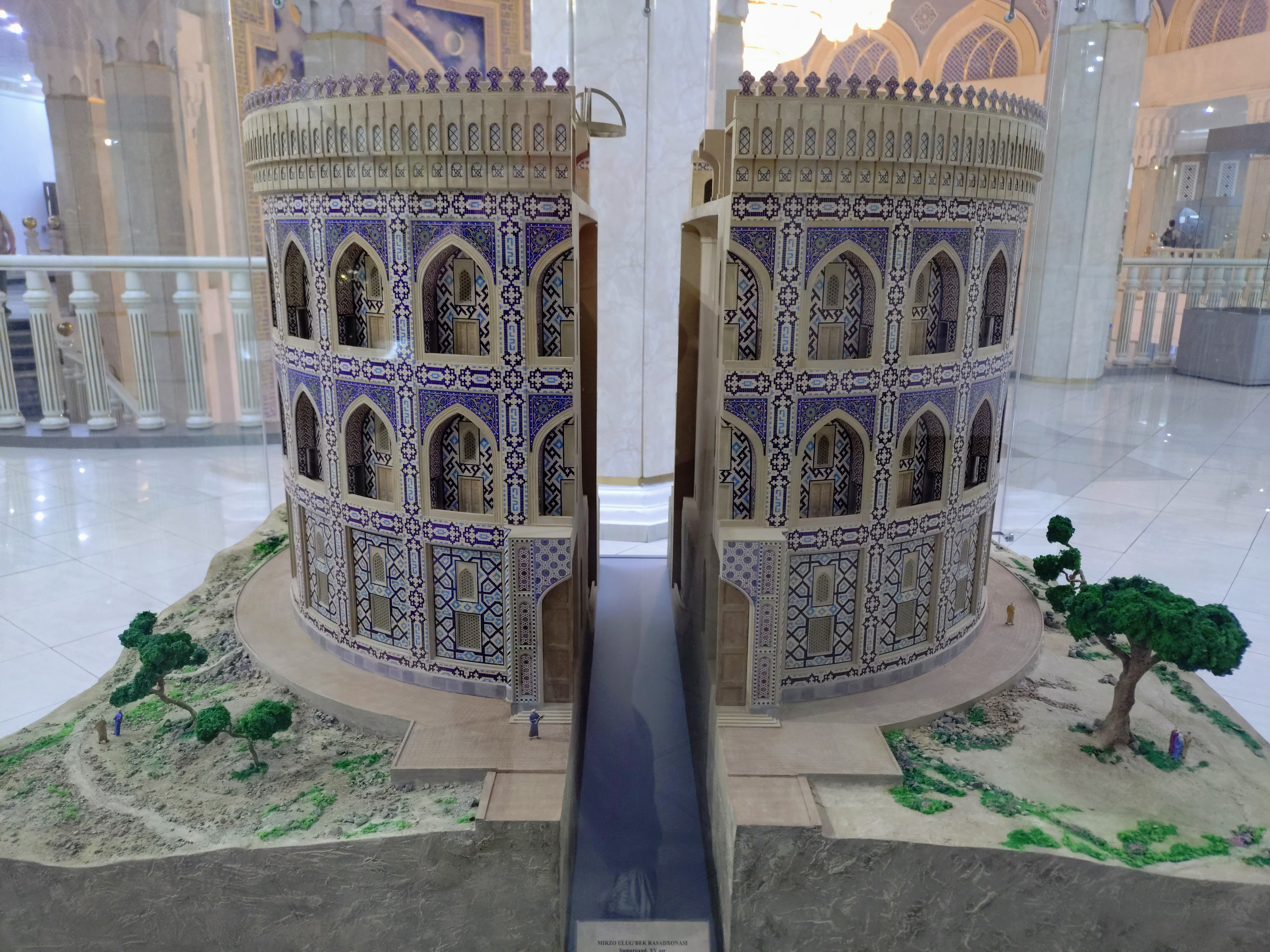
A model of Ulug Beg observatory in the Uzbek National Muzeum - the central partition hosted the huge sextant.

Astronomy piqued Ulugh Beg's interest when he visited the Maragheh Observatory at a young age. This observatory, located in Maragheh, Iran, is where the well-known astronomer Nasir al-Din al-Tusi practised.

In 1428, Ulugh Beg built an enormous observatory, similar to Tycho Brahe's later Uraniborg as well as Taqi al-Din's observatory in Constantinople. Lacking telescopes to work with, he increased his accuracy by increasing the length of his sextant; the so-called Fakhri sextant had a radius of about 36 meters (118 feet) and the optical separability of 180" (seconds of arc). The Fakhri sextant was the largest instrument at the observatory in Samarkand (an image of the sextant is on the side of this article). There were many other astronomical instruments located at the observatory, but the Fakhri sextant is the most well-known instrument there. The purpose of the Fakhri sextant was to measure the transit altitudes of the stars. This was a measurement of the maximum altitude above the horizon of the stars. It was only possible to use this device to measure the declination of celestial objects. The image, which can be found in this article, shows the remaining portion of the instrument, which consists of the underground, lower portion of the instrument that was not destroyed. The observatory built by Ulugh Beg was the most pervasive and well-known observatory throughout the Islamic world.

With the instruments located in the observatory in Samarkand, Ulugh Beg composed a star catalogue consisting of 1018 stars, which is eleven fewer stars than are present in the star catalogue of Ptolemy. Ulugh Beg utilized dimensions from al-Sufi and based his star catalogue on a new analysis that was autonomous from the data used by Ptolemy. Throughout his life as an astronomer, Ulugh Beg came to realize that there were multiple mistakes in the work and subsequent data of Ptolemy that had been in use for many years.

Using it, he compiled the 1437 Zij-i-Sultani of 994 stars, generally considered the greatest star catalogue between those of Ptolemy and Tycho Brahe, a work that stands alongside Abd al-Rahman al-Sufi's Book of Fixed Stars. The serious errors which he found in previous Arabian star catalogues (many of which had simply updated Ptolemy's work, adding the effect of precession to the longitudes) induced him to redetermine the positions of 992 fixed stars, to which he added 27 stars from Abd al-Rahman al-Sufi's catalogue Book of Fixed Stars from the year 964, which were too far south for observation from Samarkand. This catalogue, one of the most original of the Middle Ages, was first edited by Thomas Hyde at Oxford in 1665 under the title Jadāvil-i Mavāzi' S̱avābit, sive, Tabulae Long. ac Lat. Stellarum Fixarum ex Observatione Ulugh Beighi and reprinted in 1767 by G. Sharpe. More recent editions are those by Francis Baily in 1843 in Vol. XIII of the Memoirs of the Royal Astronomical Society, and by Edward Ball Knobel in Ulugh Beg's Catalogue of Stars, Revised from all Persian Manuscripts Existing in Great Britain, with a Vocabulary of Persian and Arabic Words (1917).

In 1437, Ulugh Beg determined the length of the sidereal year as 365.2570370...^{d} = 365^{d} 6^{h} 10^{m} 8^{s} (an error of +58 seconds). In his measurements over the course of many years he used a 50 m high gnomon. This value was improved by 28 seconds in 1525 by Nicolaus Copernicus, who appealed to the estimation of Thabit ibn Qurra (826–901), which had an error of +2 seconds. However, Ulugh Beg later measured another more precise value of the tropical year as 365^{d} 5^{h} 49^{m} 15^{s}, which has an error of +25 seconds, making it more accurate than Copernicus's estimate which had an error of +30 seconds. Ulugh Beg also determined the Earth's axial tilt as 23°30'17" in the sexagesimal system of degrees, minutes and seconds of arc, which in decimal notation converts to 23.5047°.

=== Mathematics ===
In mathematics, Ulugh Beg wrote accurate trigonometric tables of sine and tangent values correct to at least eight decimal places.

== Foreign relations ==
Once Ulugh Beg became governor of Samarqand, he fostered diplomatic relations with the Yongle emperor of the Ming dynasty. In 1416, Ming envoys Chen Cheng and Lu An presented silk and silver stuffs to Ulugh Beg on behalf of the Yongle emperor. In 1419, The Timurid sent his own emissaries, Sultan-Shah and Muhammad Bakhshi, to the Ming court. Ulugh Beg's emissaries came across Ghiyāth al-dīn Naqqāsh and other envoys representing Shah Rukh, Prince Baysunghur, and other Timurid authorities in Beijing; however, they stayed at separate hostelries. Ghiyāth al-dīn Naqqāsh even saw the Yongle emperor riding a black horse with white feet which had been gifted by Ulugh Beg.

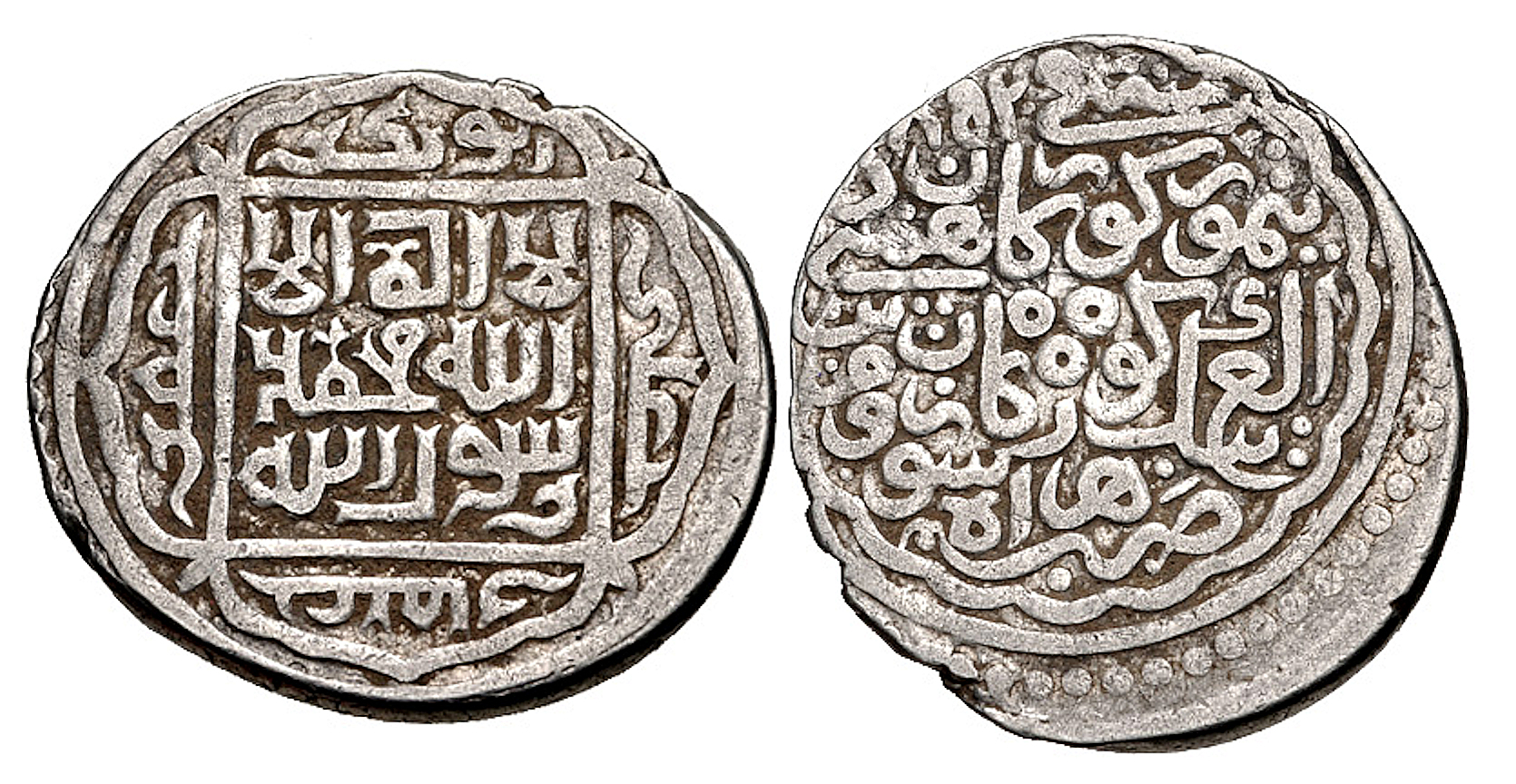
Coinage of Ulugh Beg, dated AH 852 (1448–49). Herat mint.

Ulugh Beg led two major campaigns against his neighbours. This first one took place in 1425 and was directed against Moghulistan and its ruler Shir Muhammad. He was victorious but the impact of the campaign was limited and Shir Muhammad remained in power. A year later, Baraq, Khan of the Golden Horde and former protégé of Ulugh Beg, laid claim to Timurid possessions around the Syr Darya, including the town of Sighnaq. In response to that, in 1427 Ulugh Beg, accompanied by his brother Muhummad Juki, marched against Baraq. In a hill close to Sighnaq the Timurid army was surprised by a smaller enemy force but was soundly defeated. The humiliation suffered at the hands of Baraq was to have a lasting effect on Ulugh Beg. His campaign against the Golden Horde would be the last he would undertake against a neighbouring power. The armies he later sent against them would not win any resounding victories and by the end of his reign his territories would be raided by his northern and easterly foes.

In 1439, the Zhengtong emperor ordered an artist to produce a painting of a black horse with white feet and a white forehead that had been sent by Ulugh Beg. Six years later, the Ming emperor sent a letter to Ulugh Beg in order to express his gratitude for all the "tribute" from Samarqand. The emperor sent "vessels made of gold and jade, a spear with a dragon's head, a fine horse with saddle, and variegated gold-embroidered silk stuffs" to Ulugh Beg, as well as silk stuffs and garments for the Timurid prince's family.

== War of succession and death ==
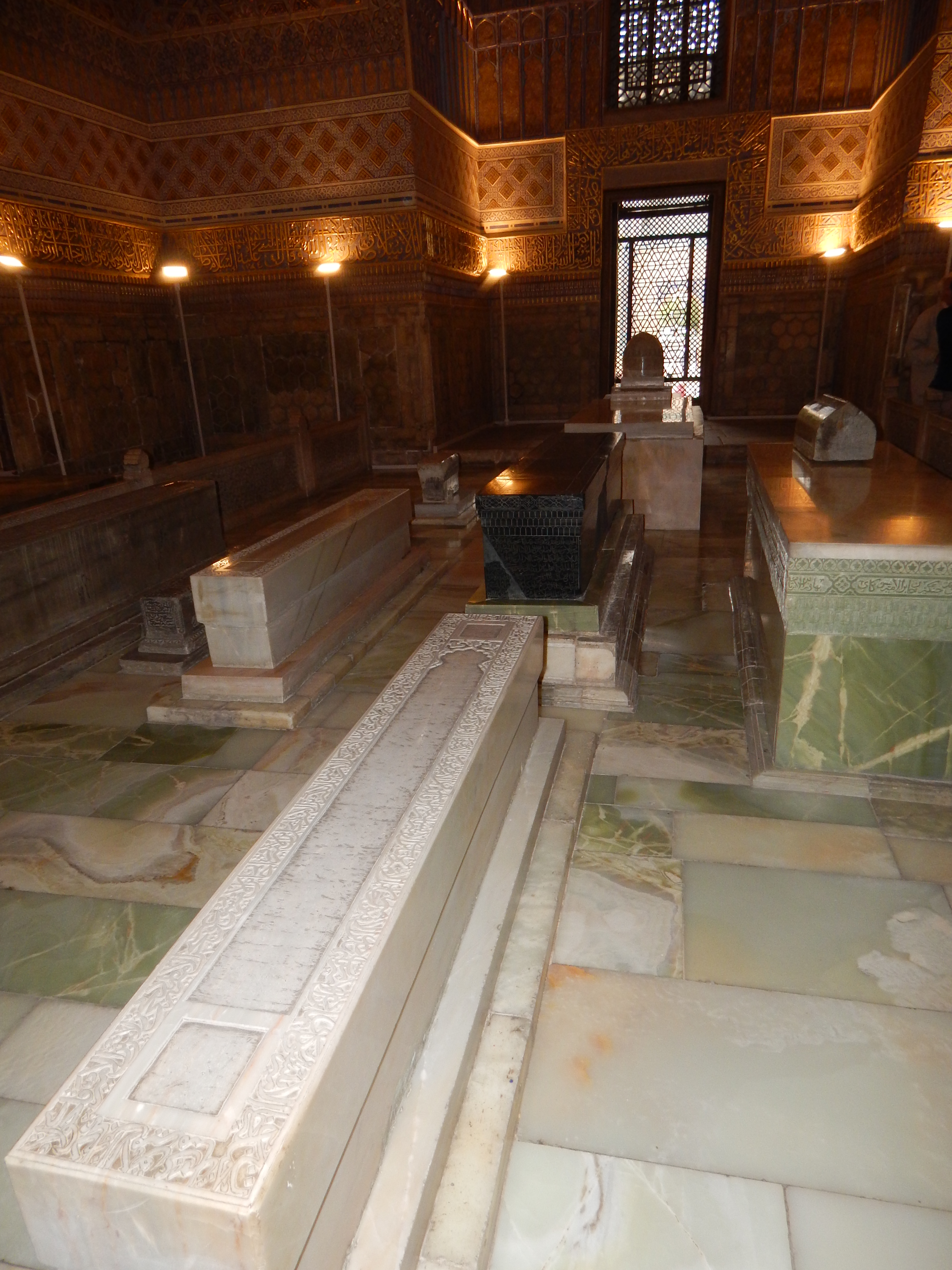
Ulugh Beg's headstone at the foot of Timur's in the Gur-e-Amir

In 1447, upon learning of the death of his father Shah Rukh, Ulugh Beg went to Balkh. Here, he heard that Ala al-Dawla, the son of his late brother Baysunghur, had claimed the rulership of the Timurid Empire in Herat. Consequently, Ulugh Beg marched against Ala al-Dawla and met him in battle at Murghab. He defeated his nephew and advanced toward Herat, massacring its people in 1448. However, Abul-Qasim Babur Mirza, Ala al-Dawla's brother, came to the latter's aid and defeated Ulugh Beg.

Ulugh Beg retreated to Balkh where he found that its governor, his oldest son Abdal-Latif Mirza, had rebelled against him. Another civil war ensued. Abdal-Latif recruited troops to meet his father's army on the banks of the Amu Darya river. However, Ulugh Beg was forced to retreat to Samarkand before any fighting took place, having heard news of turmoil in the city. Abdal-Latif soon reached Samarkand and Ulugh Beg involuntarily surrendered to his son. Abd-al-Latif released his father from custody, allowing him to make pilgrimage to Mecca. However, he ensured Ulugh Beg never reached his destination, having him, as well as his brother Abdal-Aziz assassinated in 1449.

Eventually, Ulugh Beg's reputation was rehabilitated by his nephew, Abdallah Mirza (1450–1451), who placed his remains at Timur's feet in the Gur-e-Amir in Samarkand, where they were found by Soviet archaeologists in 1941.

== Marriages ==
Ladies of the harem of Ulugh Beg. Contemporary Timurid painting, 1425-50. Freer Gallery of Art, Washington D.C.

Ulugh Beg had sixteen consorts:

- Aka Begi, daughter of Muhammad Sultan Mirza bin Jahangir Mirza and Khan Sultan Khanika, mother of Habiba Sultan known as Khanzada Begum and another Khanzada Begum;
- Sultan Badi al-mulk Begum, daughter of Khalil Sultan bin Miran Shah and Shad Malik Agha;
- Aqi Sultan Khanika, daughter of Sultan Mahmud Khan Ogeday;
- Husn Nigar Khanika, daughter of Shams-i-Jahan Khan Chaghatay;
- Shukr Bi Khanika, daughter of Darwīsh Khan of the Golden Horde;
- Rukaiya Sultan Agha, an Arlat lady, and mother of Abdal-Latif Mirza, Ak Bash Begum and Sultan Bakht Begum;
- Mihr Sultan Agha, daughter of Tukal bin Sarbuka;
- Sa'adat Bakht Agha, daughter of Bayan Kukaltash, mother of Qutlugh Turkhan Agha;
- Daulat Sultan Agha, daughter of Khawand Sa'id;
- Bakhti Bi Agha, daughter of Aka Sufi Uzbek;
- Daulat Bakht Agha, daughter of Sheikh Muhammad Barlas;
- Sultanim Agha, mother of Abdul Hamid Mirza and Abdul Jabrar Mirza;
- Sultan Malik Agha, daughter of Nasir-al-Din, mother of Ubaydullah Mirza, Abdullah Mirza and another Abdullah Mirza;
- A daughter of Abu'l-Khayr Khan, khan of Uzbek Khanate;
- Khutan Agha;
- A daughter of Aqila Sultan;

== Legacy ==
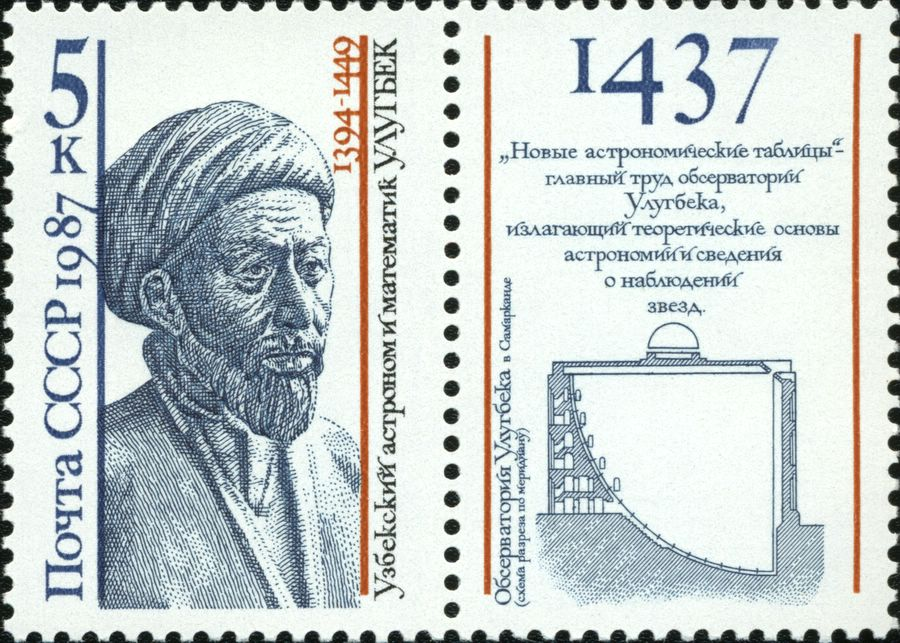
Ulugh Beg and his astronomical observatory scheme, depicted on the 1987 USSR stamp. He was one of Islam's greatest astronomers during the Middle Ages. The stamp says "Uzbek astronomer and mathematician Ulugbek" in Russian.

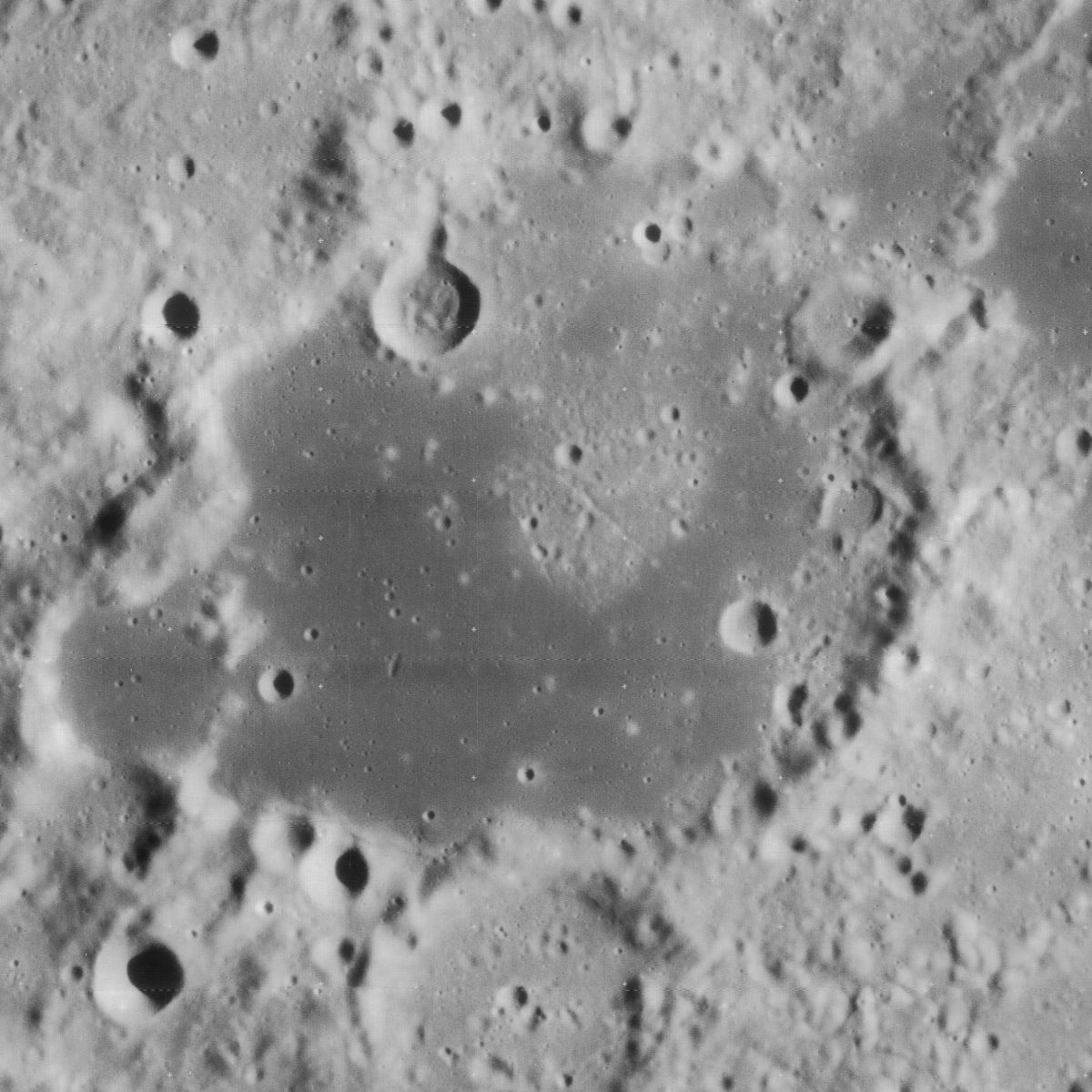
The Ulugh Beigh crater on the Moon, named for Ulugh Beg.

- The crater, Ulugh Beigh, on the Moon, was named after him by the German astronomer Johann Heinrich von Mädler on his 1830 map of the Moon.
- 2439 Ulugbek, a main-belt asteroid which was discovered on 21 August 1977 by N. Chernykh at Nauchnyj, was named after him.
- The 2017 documentary The Man Who Unlocked The Universe is based on his life, with Lola Karimova-Tillyaeva as executive producer.
- The dinosaur Ulughbegsaurus was named after him in 2021.

== Exhumation ==
Soviet anthropologist Mikhail M. Gerasimov reconstructed the face of Ulugh Beg through the analysis of the remains that were exhumed from his tomb in 1941.

== See also ==
- Aryabhata, ancient Indian astronomer
- Ulugh Beg Observatory and Museum
- Ulugh Beg Madrasa in Samarkand
- Ulugh beg Madrasa in Bukhara

== Bibliography ==
- O'Connor, John J.; Robertson, Edmund F., "Ulugh Beg", MacTutor History of Mathematics Archive, University of St Andrews
- 1839. L. P. E. A. Sedillot (1808–1875). Tables astronomiques d’Oloug Beg, commentees et publiees avec le texte en regard, Tome I, 1 fascicule, Paris. A very rare work, but referenced in the Bibliographie generale de l’astronomie jusqu’en 1880, by J.
- 1847. L. P. E. A. Sedillot (1808–1875). Prolegomenes des Tables astronomiques d’Oloug Beg, publiees avec Notes et Variantes, et precedes d’une Introduction. Paris: F. Didot.
- 1853. L. P. E. A. Sedillot (1808–1875). Prolegomenes des Tables astronomiques d’Oloug Beg, traduction et commentaire. Paris.
- Le Prince Savant annexe les étoiles, Frédérique Beaupertuis-Bressand, in Samarcande 1400–1500, La cité-oasis de Tamerlan : coeur d'un Empire et d'une Renaissance, book directed by Vincent Fourniau, éditions Autrement, 1995, ISSN 1157-4488.
- L'âge d'or de l'astronomie ottomane, Antoine Gautier, in L'Astronomie, (Monthly magazine created by Camille Flammarion in 1882), December 2005, volume 119.
- L'observatoire du prince Ulugh Beg, Antoine Gautier, in L'Astronomie, (Monthly magazine created by Camille Flammarion in 1882), October 2008, volume 122.
- Le recueil de calendriers du prince timouride Ulug Beg (1394–1449), Antoine Gautier, in Le Bulletin, n° spécial Les calendriers, Institut National des Langues et Civilisations Orientales, juin 2007, pp. 117–123. d
- Jean-Marie Thiébaud, Personnages marquants d'Asie centrale, du Turkestan et de l'Ouzbékistan, Paris, éditions L'Harmattan, 2004. ISBN 2-7475-7017-7.

Ulugh Beg Timurid dynasty
Preceded by Shah Rukh	Timurid Empire; 1447–1449	Succeeded by 'Abd al-Latif
