= Qur'an Gate =

City gate in Shiraz, Iran

- دروازه قرآن
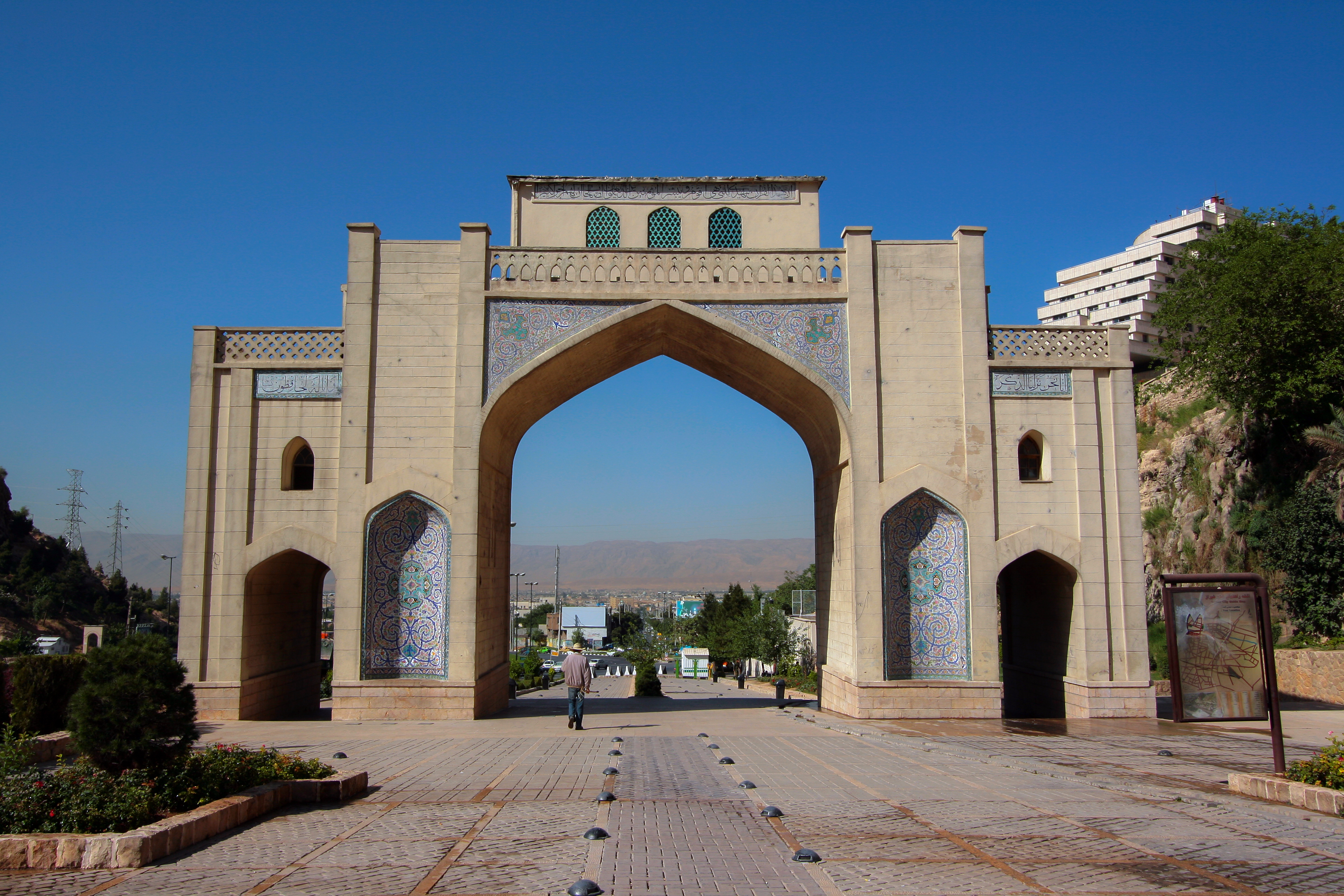
- Qur'an Gate in 2017
- Interactive map of the Qur'an Gate area

General information
- Location: Shiraz, Iran

Qur'an Gate (Persian: دروازه قرآن) or Shiraz Gate (Persian: دروازه شیراز) is a historic gate in the north of Shiraz, Iran. It is located at the northeastern entrance of the city, on the way to Marvdasht and Isfahan, between Baba Kouhi and Chehel Maqam Mountains near Allahu Akbar gorge.

== History ==
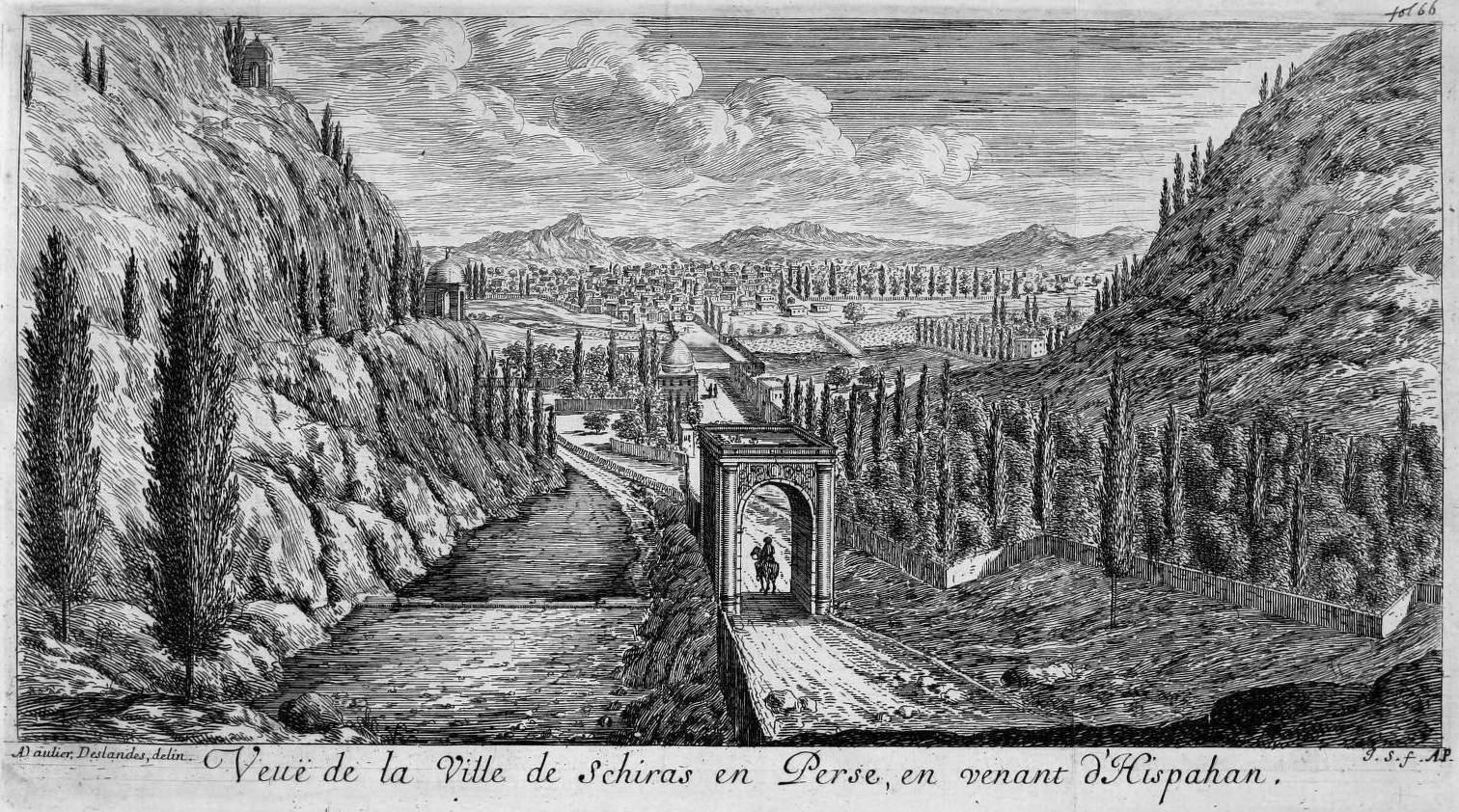
Qur'an Gate by André Daulier Deslandes, 1671

The Gate was first built during the reign of 'Adud al-Dawla in the 10th century. By the Zand era in the 18th century, it had sustained a lot of damages and was therefore restored. Moreover, a small room was added on top where hand-written Qur’āns by Ibrahim Sultan were kept. The two Qur’āns are known as Hifdah-Man.

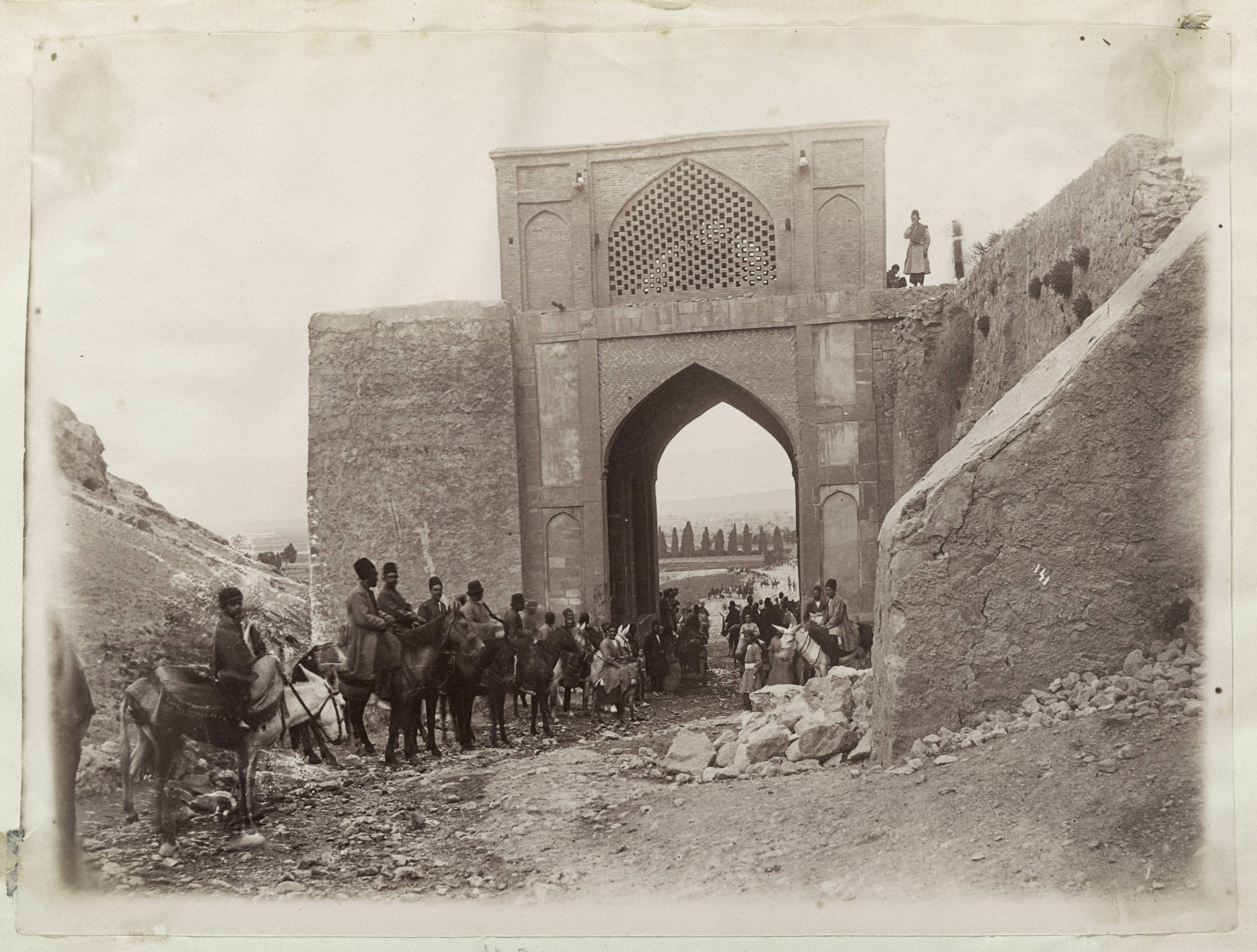
Qur'an Gate in the late 19th century

During the Qajar era, the gate was damaged by multiple earthquakes; it was later restored by Mohammad Zaki Khan Nouri. In 1937, the two Qur’āns were taken from the gate and were taken to the Pars Museum in Shiraz, where they remain today. In 1949, the arch of the gate was restored by Hosein Igar, a merchant also known as Etemad Tojar.
