= Abdal-Latif Mirza =

Amir of the Timurid Empire from 1449 to 1450

'Abd al-Latif

Amir of the Timurid Empire
- Reign: 27 October 1449 – 9 May 1450
- Predecessor: Ulugh Beg
- Successor: Abdullah Mirza
- Born: 1420
- Died: 9 May 1450 (aged 30); Samarkand
- Burial: Samarkand, Uzbekistan
- Spouse: Shah Sultan Agha
- Issue: Abdul Razaq Mirza; Ahmad Mirza; Mahmud Mirza; Juki Mirza; Muhammad Baqir Mirza; Qatak Sultan Begum
Names
- Abd al-Latif ibn Muhammad Taraghay Ulughbek
- House: Timurid Empire
- Dynasty: Timurid
- Father: Ulugh Beg
- Mother: Ruqaiya Sultan Agha
- Religion: Islam

Abdal-Latif Mirza (c. 1420 – 9 May 1450) was the great-grandson of Central Asian emperor Timur. He was the third son of Ulugh Beg, Timurid ruler of Transoxiana (modern Uzbekistan, Tajikistan and parts of Turkmenistan, Kyrgyzstan and Kazakhstan) and Roqya Katun Arolat.

== Early years ==
He was brought up at the court of his grandfather Shah Rukh. It is known that he received a scientific and general education like his father, Ulugh Beg, however some historians suggest that he retained less Mongolian traditions since he grew up in Herat.

Having been given the governorship of Balkh, Abdal-Latif Mirza served under his father. During the succession struggle that followed the death of Shah Rukh, Ulugh Beg occupied Herat, although after he left the city at the end of 1448, it was conquered by Abul-Qasim Babur Mirza.

Abdal-Latif Mirza did not remain loyal to his father. Angry over the fact that he was to be passed over in the transfer of rule of Samarkand, he revolted while Ulugh Beg was marching to retake Khorasan. He defeated his father at Dimashq, near Samarkand, in the fall of 1449.

Ulugh Beg later decided to surrender himself, and Abdal-Latif Mirza granted him permission to take a pilgrimage to Mecca, though he then had Ulugh Beg murdered en route. This earned Abdal-Latif Mirza the infamous nickname Padar-kush, or Pedar-kush (from Persian "killer of his father، پدر کش"). A few days later he also had his brother 'Abd al-'Aziz killed.

== Death ==
In this manner he became ruler of Transoxiana. A somewhat pious person, he gained the support of the local religious groups, but this did not save him from a conspiracy hatched against him by the amirs. His reign lasted for only six months. He was succeeded by his cousin Abdullah Mirza.

== Personal life ==
Consort

- Shah Sultan Agha, daughter of Muhammad Musharaf son of Hamid, a Mughal Amir;

Sons

- Abul Razaq Mirza - with Shah Sultan Agha;
- Ahmad Mirza - with Shah Sultan Agha;
- Mahmud Mirza - with Shah Sultan Agha;
- Juki Mirza - with Shah Sultan Agha;
- Muhammad Baqir Mirza - with Shah Sultan Agha;

Daughter

Qatak Sultan Begum - with Shah Sultan Agha;

Abdal-Latif Mirza Timurid dynasty
Preceded by Ulugh Beg	Timurid Empire (in Samarkand)	Succeeded by Abdullah Mirza
