= Ulugh Beigh (crater) =

Crater on the Moon

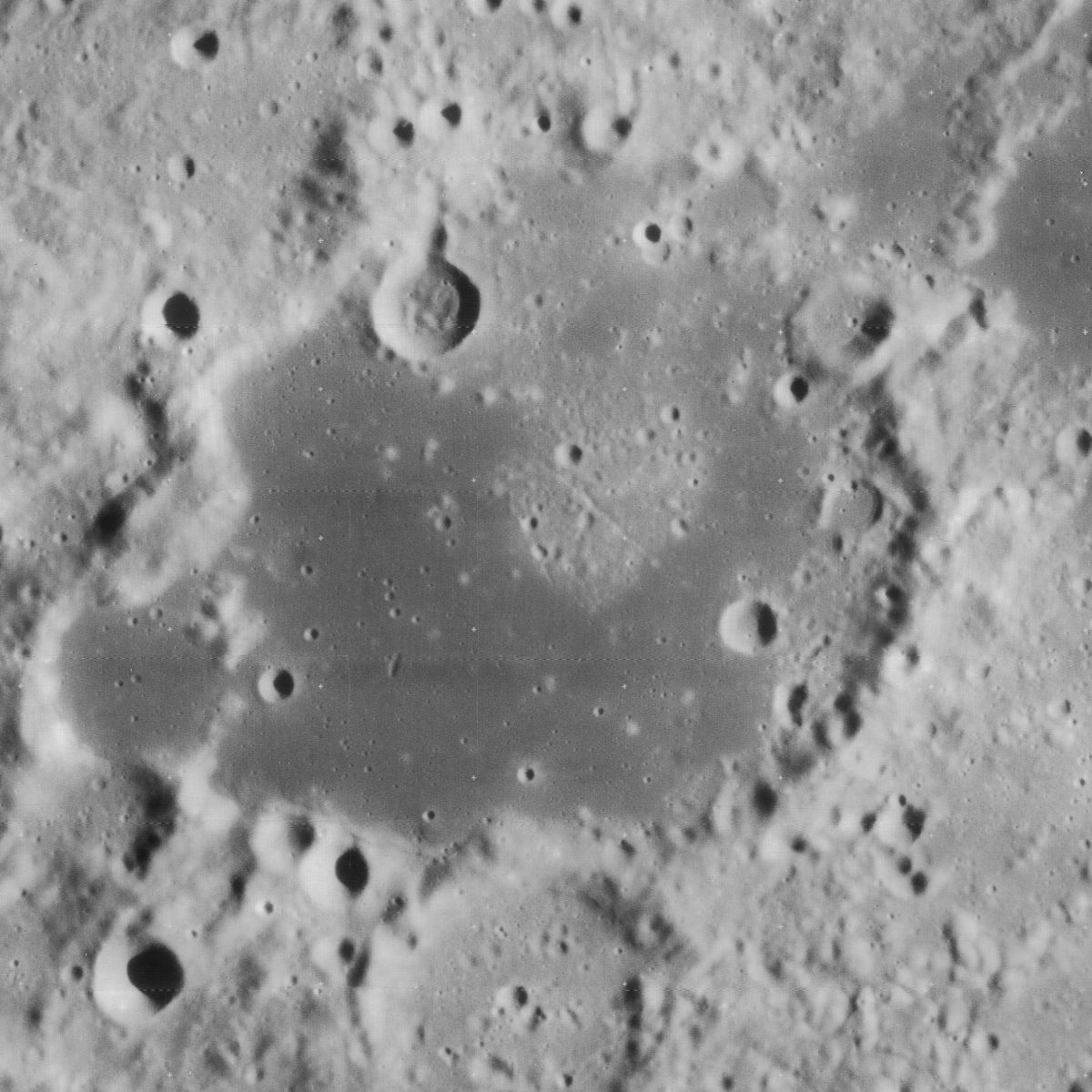
- Lunar Orbiter 4 image
- Coordinates: 32.7°N 81.9°W
- Diameter: 54 km
- Depth: 1.7 km
- Colongitude: 83° at sunrise
- Eponym: Ulugh Beg

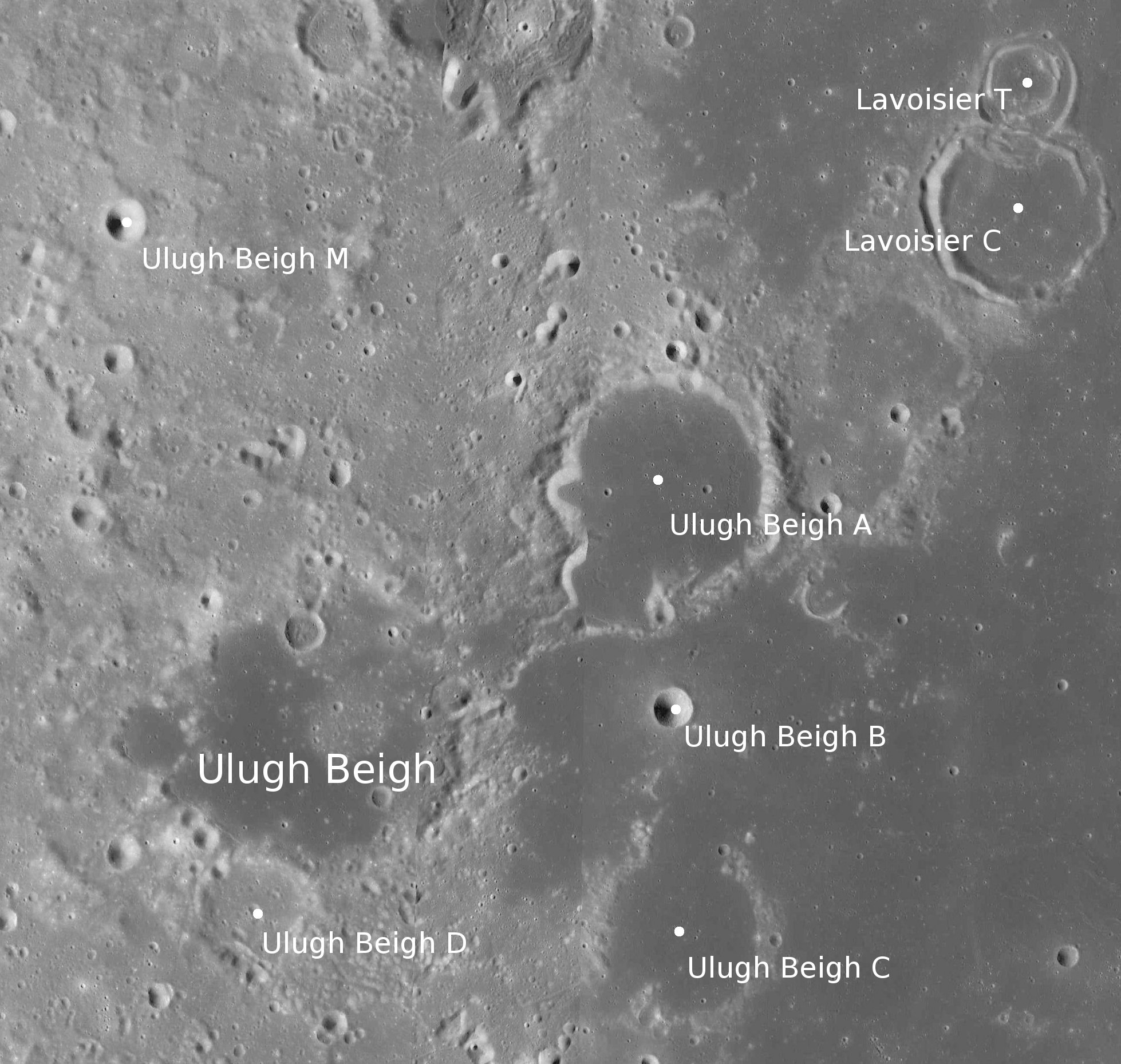
Satellite craters of Ulugh Beigh

Ulugh Beigh is the remnant of a lunar impact crater that is located just to the west of the Oceanus Procellarum. It is located near the northwestern limb of the Moon, and from the Earth it appears foreshortened. Farther to the west is the smaller crater Aston, and to the north is Lavoisier. Both these craters are roughly equidistant from Ulugh Beigh, although Aston appears much closer due to the oblique viewing angle.

The rim of this crater has been nearly worn away by impacts, leaving a disintegrated perimeter that is notched and incised by impacts. Ulugh Beigh D lies across the southern part of the floor, and a smaller crater along the western rim shares a common floor with Ulugh Beigh. The interior floor of this crater has been resurfaced by lava, leaving a dark surface with the same albedo as the neighboring mare. The northern part of the crater has a higher albedo than this dark surface, matching the appearance of the terrain to the west of the mare.

Ulugh Beigh A is located to the northeast of the main crater, and forms a flooded crater along the edge of the Oceanus Procellarum. This is a merged formation with a smaller crater lying across the southwest rim of the larger, and the two sharing a common dark floor.

This formation is named after the Timurid king and science patron Mīrzā Muhammad bin Shāhrukh, popularly known as Uluğ Bey (Chaghatai: great king), who supported the work of several well-known astronomers.

== Satellite craters ==
By convention, these features are identified on lunar maps by placing the letter on the side of the crater midpoint that is closest to Ulugh Beigh.

Ulugh Beigh	Latitude	Longitude	Diameter
A	34.1° N	79.3° W	41 km
B	32.8° N	79.3° W	8 km
C	31.4° N	79.1° W	31 km
D	31.6° N	82.4° W	21 km
M	35.7° N	83.4° W	7 km

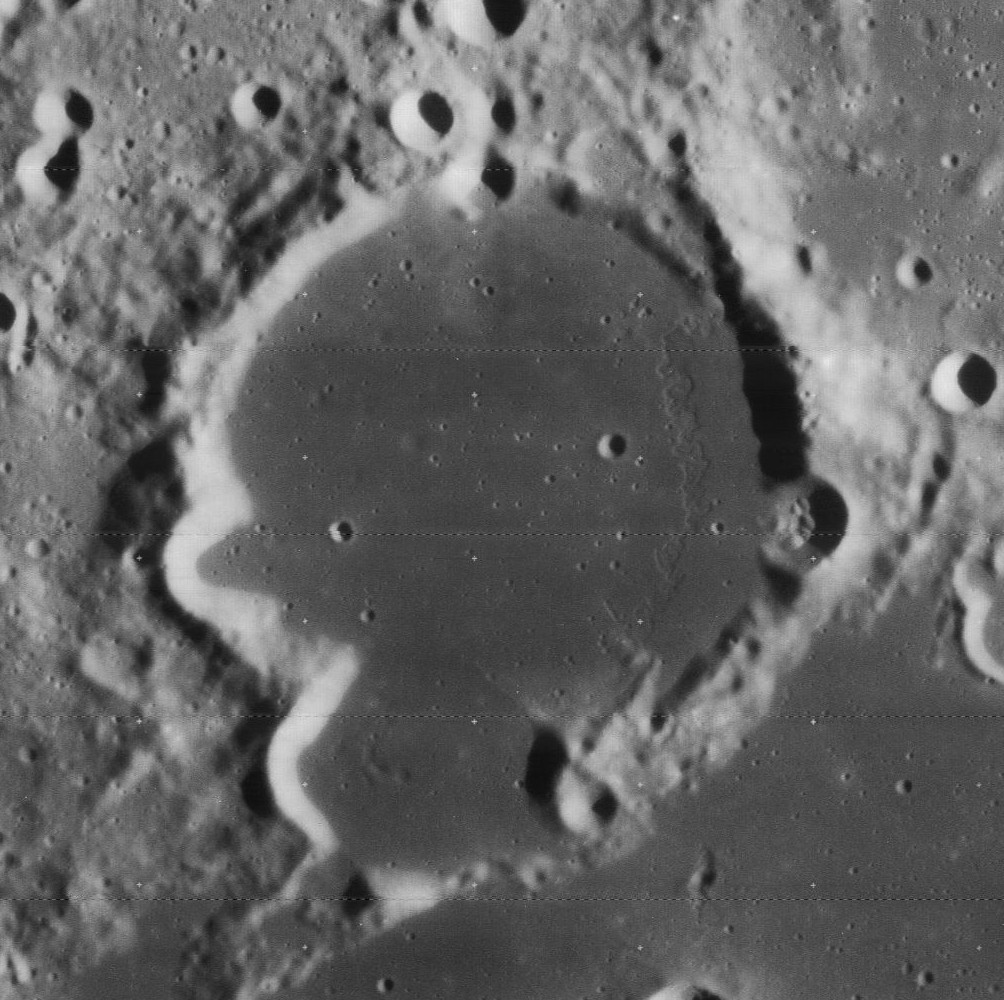
Ulugh Beigh A
