= Abdullah Mirza =

15th-century amir of the Timurid Empire

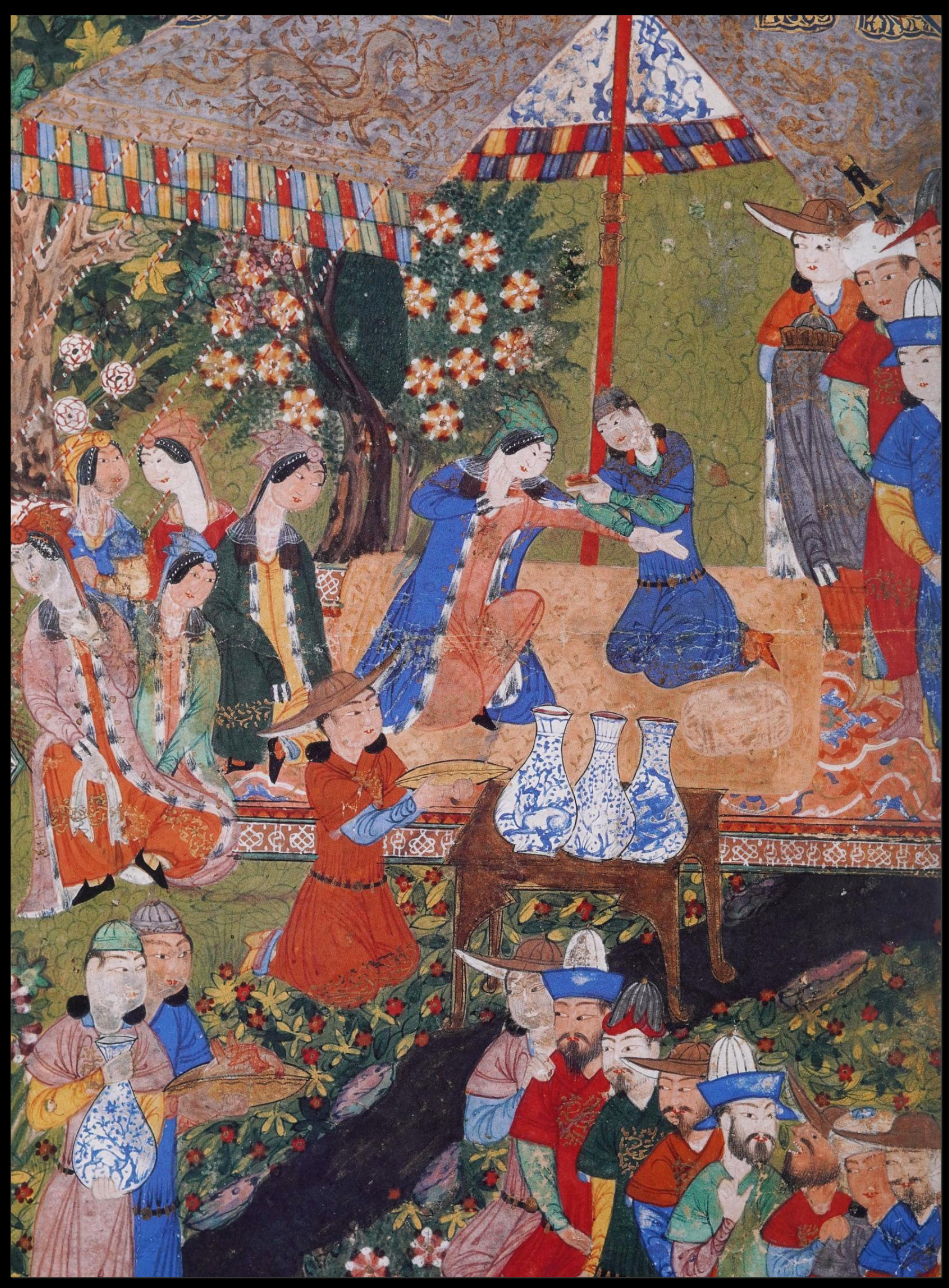
- Contemporary Timurid court scene, in Shiraz. Frontispiece of a Shahnama (1444), likely commissioned by Abdullah Mirza.

Amir of the Timurid Empire in Transoxiana
- Reign: 9 May 1450 – June 1451
- Predecessor: Abdal-Latif Mirza
- Successor: Abu Sa'id Mirza
- Born: After 1410 during the Timurid Empire
- Died: June 1451 (aged 40-41); Central Asia
Names
- Abdullah Mirza ibn Ibrahim Sultan ibn Shah Rukh
- Dynasty: Timurid
- Father: Ibrahim Sultan
- Mother: Mihr Sultan Agha

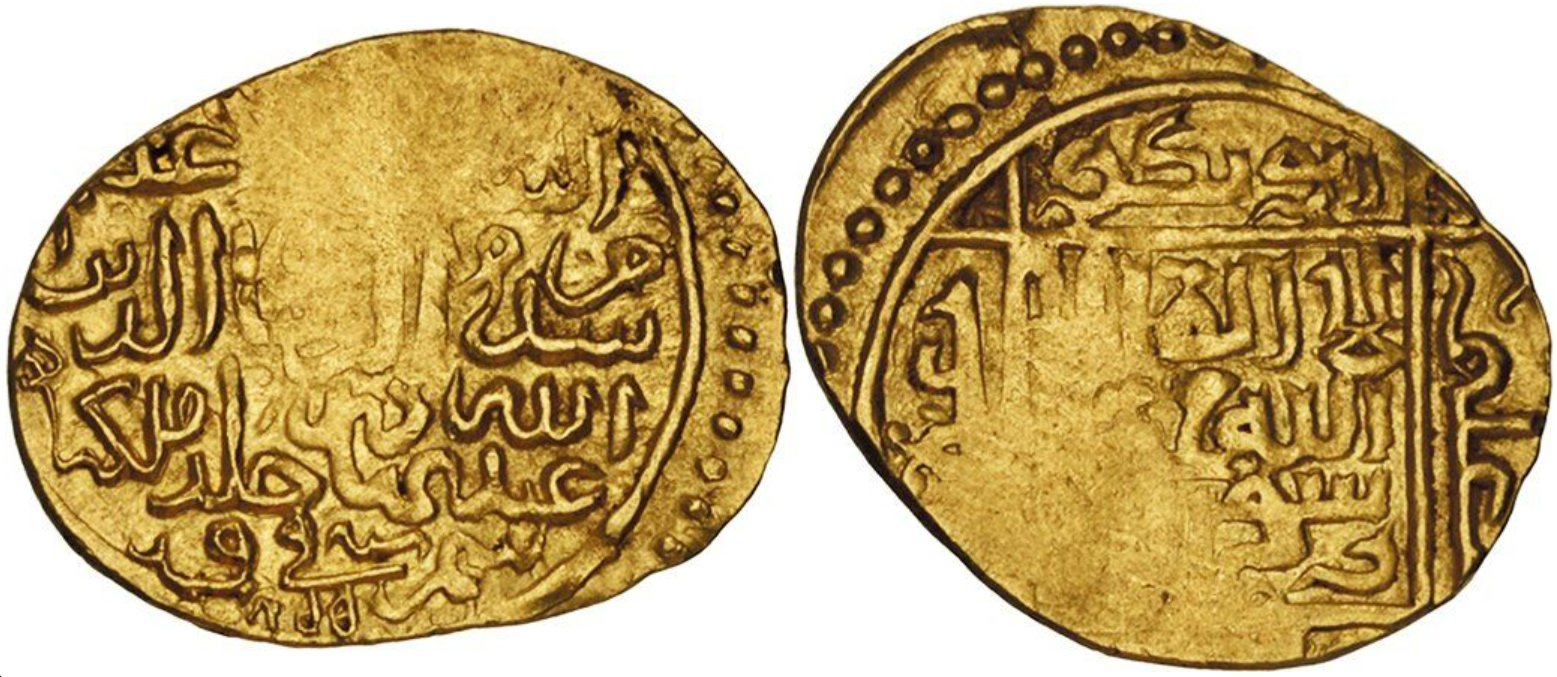
Coinage of 'Abdallah Mirza. Samarqand mint. Dated AH 855 (1451-2)

'Abdullah Mirza (after 1410 – June 1451) was a short-lived ruler of the Timurid Empire, which encompassed the territory shared by present-day Iran, Afghanistan, Pakistan, along with substantial areas of India, Mesopotamia and Caucasus.

As a member of the Timurid dynasty, Abdullah Mirza was a great-grandson of Timur, a grandson of Shah Rukh and a son of Ibrahim Sultan.

== Early life ==
=== Governor of Fars (1435-1447) ===
Abdullah Mirza was Governor of Fars from 1435 to 1447, succeeding to his father Ibrāhim b. Shāhrukh who had held the position from 1415-1435, after the first Timurid Governor of the region Iskandar Sulṭān b. ‘Umar Shaykh (1409-1415).

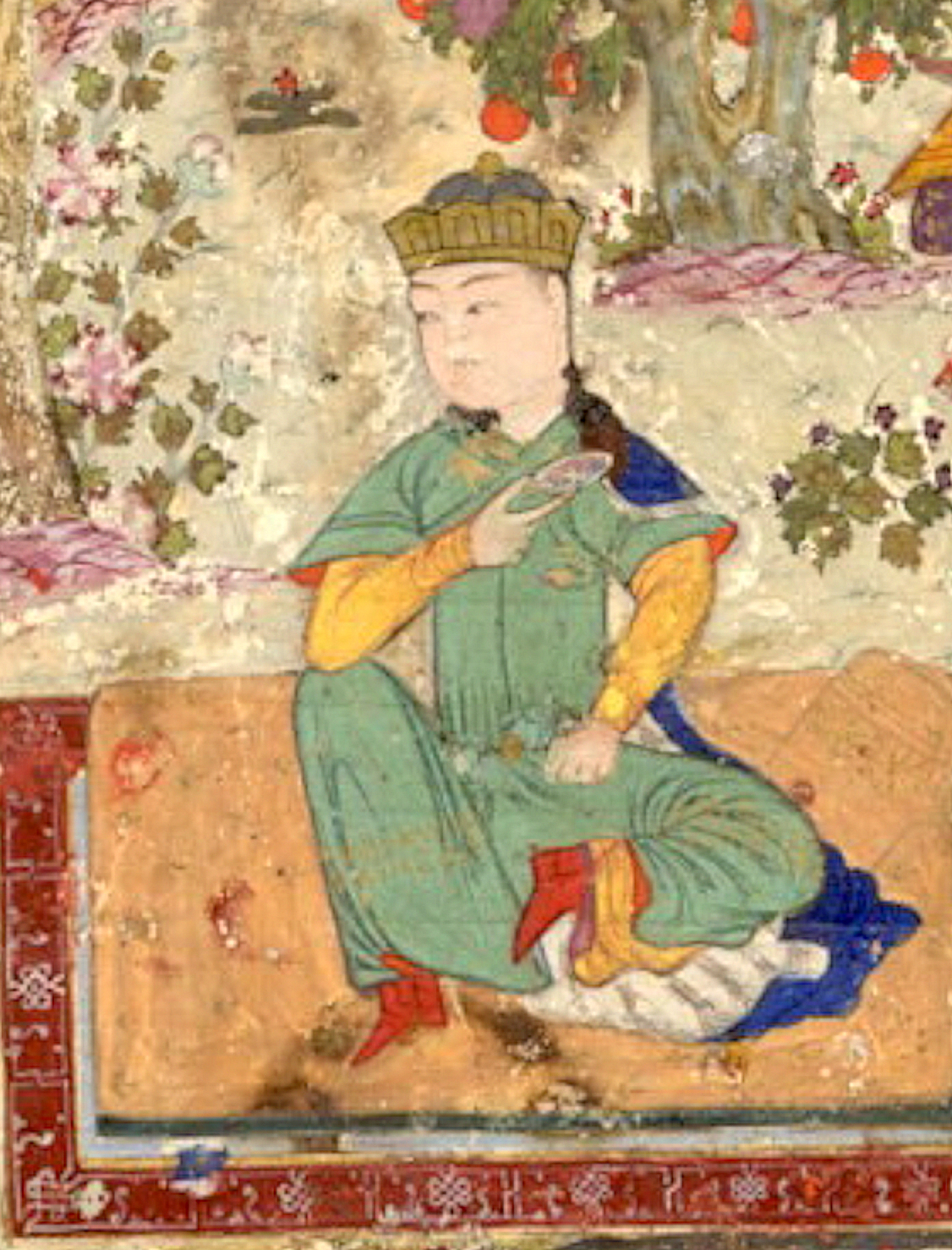
Depiction of the ruler who commissioned the Shiraz Shahnama of 1437.

Granted the governorship of Fars by his grandfather Shah Rukh, Abdullah Mirza found his position threatened by his cousin Sultan Muhammad during the 1447 succession crisis which followed Shah Rukh's death, and was forced to abandon the province. Weakened by these conflicts, western Iran was soon conquered first by the Qara Qoyunlu under Jahan Shah circa 1452.

=== Art of the book ===
Various important works were created during the governorship of Abdullah Mirza in Shiraz, Fars:

- Shahnama 1437, Shiraz (Leiden University Libraries, Or. 494)
- Khamsa and Divan of Khwaju Kirmani, 1438, Shiraz (Sackler, S1986.34)
- Tarikh-i Jahangushay, 1438, Shiraz
- Shahnama 1441, Shiraz.
- Shahnama, 1444, Shiraz
- Khamsa of Nizami, 1443-46, Abarkuh near Shiraz (Princeton University, Ms. 77 G)

== Reign as emperor ==
As a supporter of Ulugh Beg, Abdullah Mirza was imprisoned in 1450 by 'Abd al-Latif following the latter's rise to power. When 'Abd al-Latif was murdered, he was released and made ruler of Samarkand, for which he was forced to lavish money upon the troops that supported him. Despite this, he did not enjoy widespread popularity.

During his relatively brief reign, a revolt created by Sultan Muhammad's brother Ala al-Dawla Mirza did not seriously threaten him, but a rising initiated by Abu Sa'id Mirza, whose home base, at the time, was in Bukhara, proved to be fatal. Marching from Tashkent to Samarkand with the support of Abu'l-Khayr Khan, Abu Sa'id Mirza defeated Abdullah Mirza and executed him in 1451, taking his place on the throne.

== Sources ==
- Roemer, H. R. (1986). "The Successors of Timur". The Cambridge History of Iran, Volume 6: The Timurid and Safavid Periods. Ed. Peter Jackson. New York, New York: Cambridge University Press. ISBN 0-521-20094-6

Abdullah Mirza Timurid dynasty
Preceded by Abdal-Latif Mirza	Timurid Empire (in Samarkand)	Succeeded by Abu Sa'id Mirza
