= Pars Museum =

Museum in Shiraz, Iran

Coordinates: 29°36′57.63″N 52°32′42″E

Pars Museum/Nazar Garden باغ نظر/موزه پارس
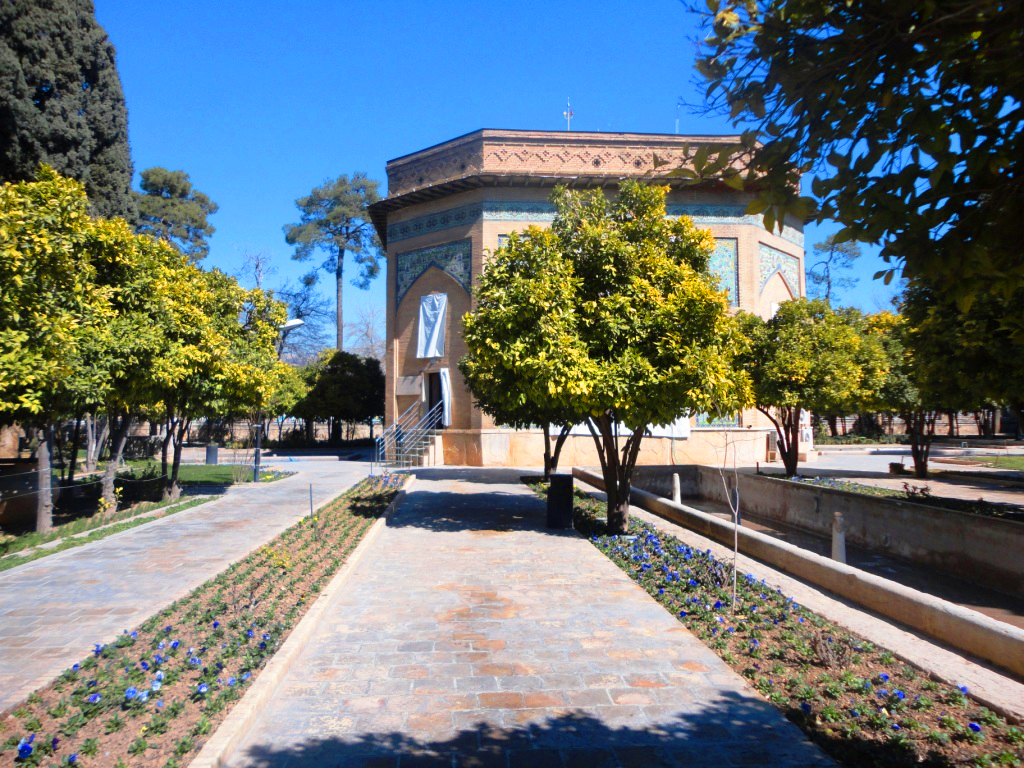
- Interactive map of Pars Museum/Nazar Garden باغ نظر/موزه پارس
- Location: Shiraz, Iran

History
- Founded: 1936

Iran National Heritage List
- Official name: Pars Museum/Nazar Garden
- Type: Museum/Persian Garden
- Designated: 1935
- Reference no.: 244
- Conservation organization: Cultural Heritage, Handicrafts and Tourism Organization of Iran

The Pars Museum (Persian: موزه پارس) is a museum in Shiraz, Fars province, Iran. Founded in 1936 under Reza Shah Pahlavi, it is located in Nazar Garden.

The octagonal building was the place in which royal guests were hosted by the Zand dynasty of Iran. It was also used for holding official ceremonies. It is the burial place of Karim Khan Zand.

== Nazar Garden ==
The old Nazar Garden was one of the largest gardens in Shiraz during the Safavid era (1501–1736). During the Zand era (1751–1794), Karim Khan built an octagon structure which was called Kolah Farangi. It was used to receive and entertain foreign guests and ambassadors and hold official ceremonies.

=== Pars Museum ===
In 1936, the pavilion became a museum. It was the first museum which was located outside the capital city of Tehran. The brick designs, tiling, pictures and big stone dadoes are among the architectural features of the building.

Pars museum displays almost 30 handwritten Qurans and a number of magnificent paintings of famous Persian artists. Among the paintings is the well-known Karim Khan's Smoking Shisha created by Jafar Naqash.

== Gallery ==
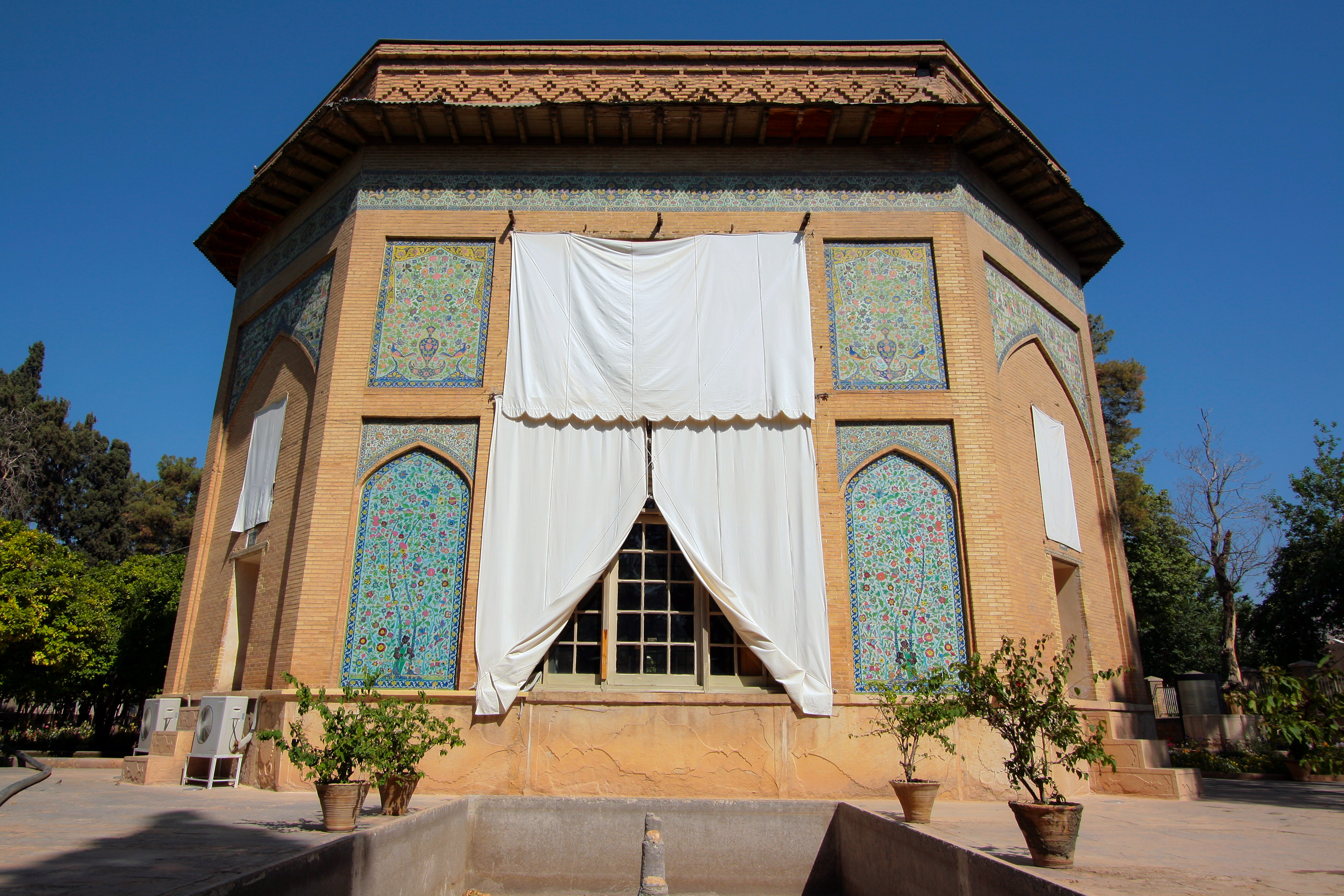
The pavilion

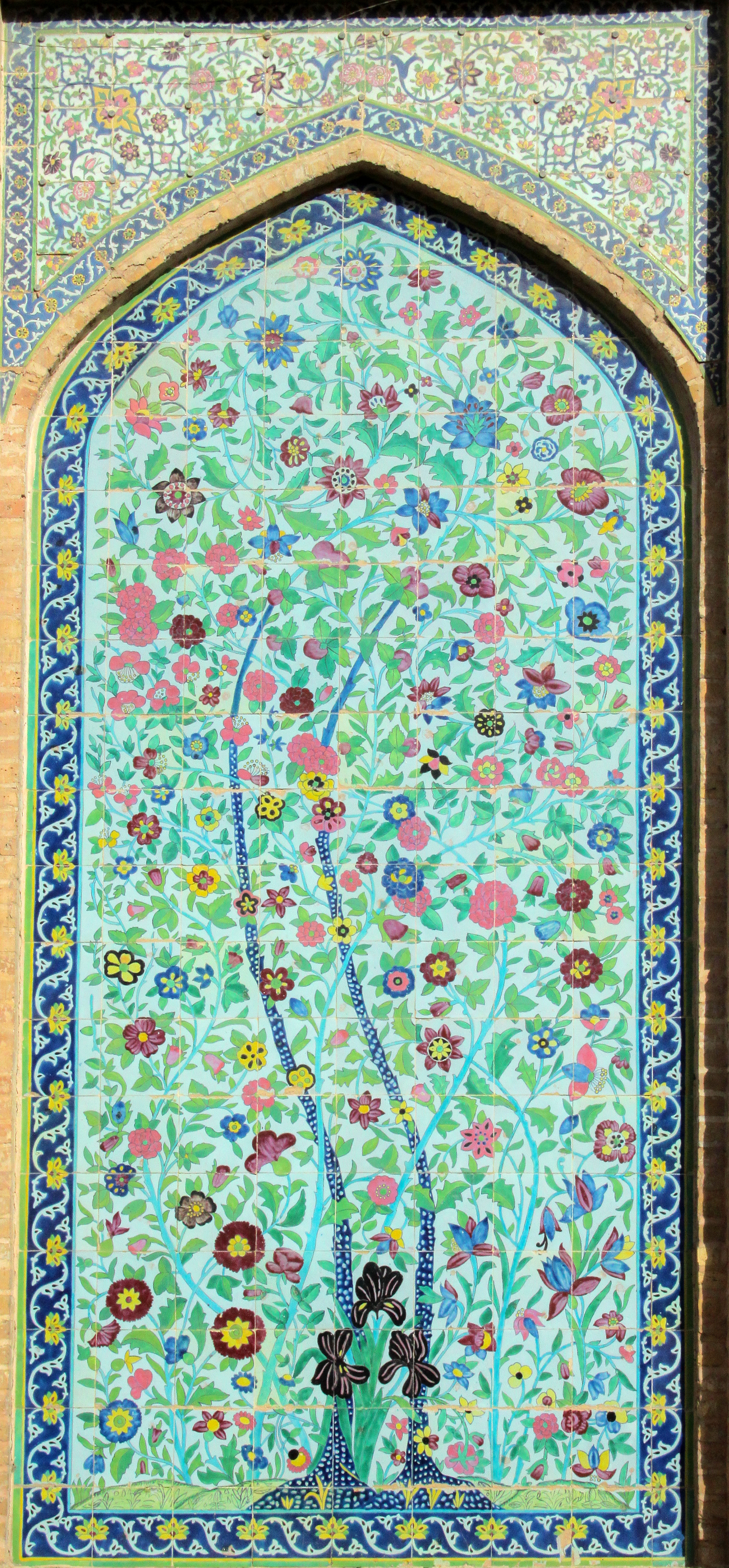
Tilework on the exterior of the pavilion

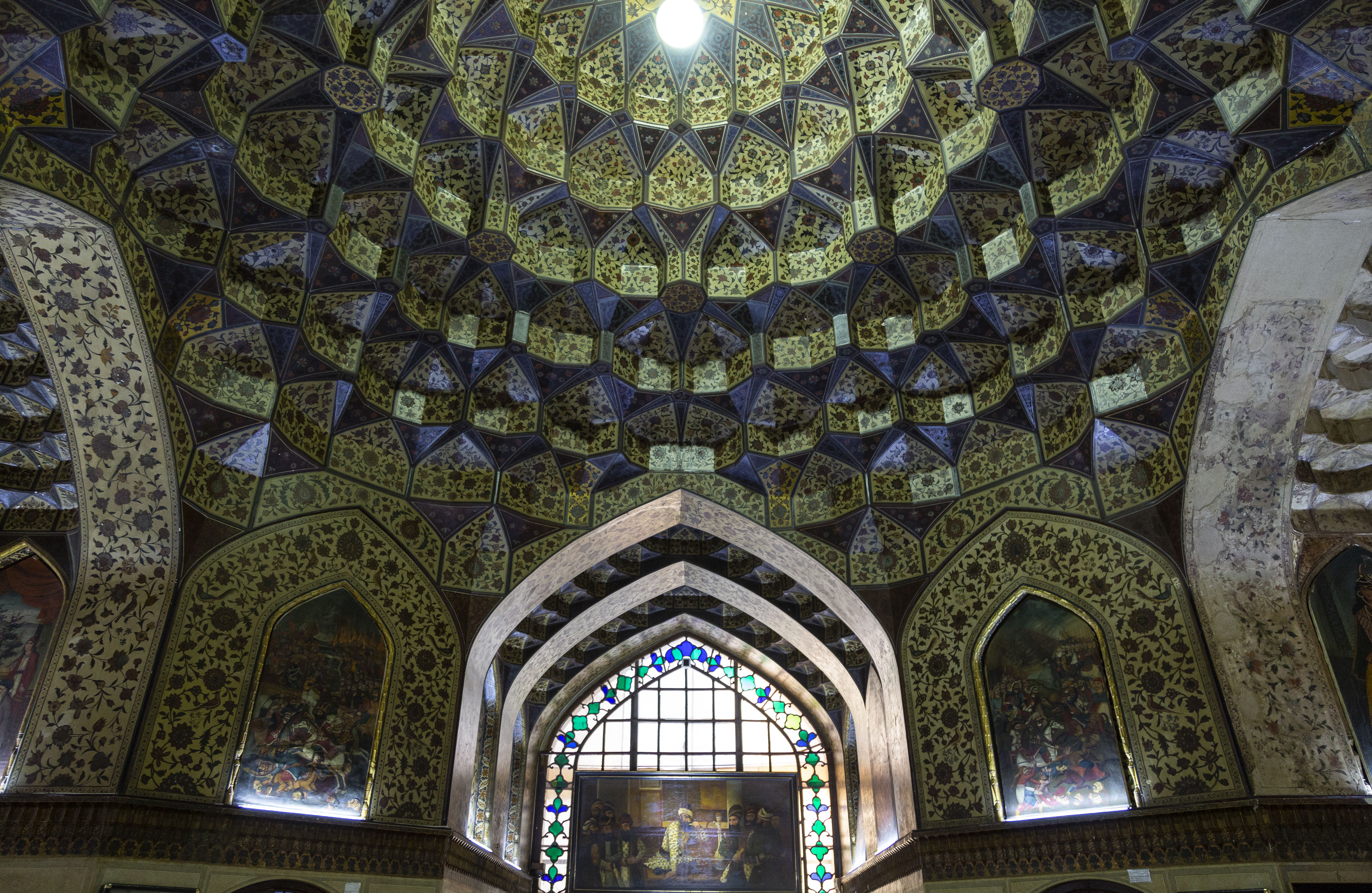
Muqarnas on the ceiling of the pavilion

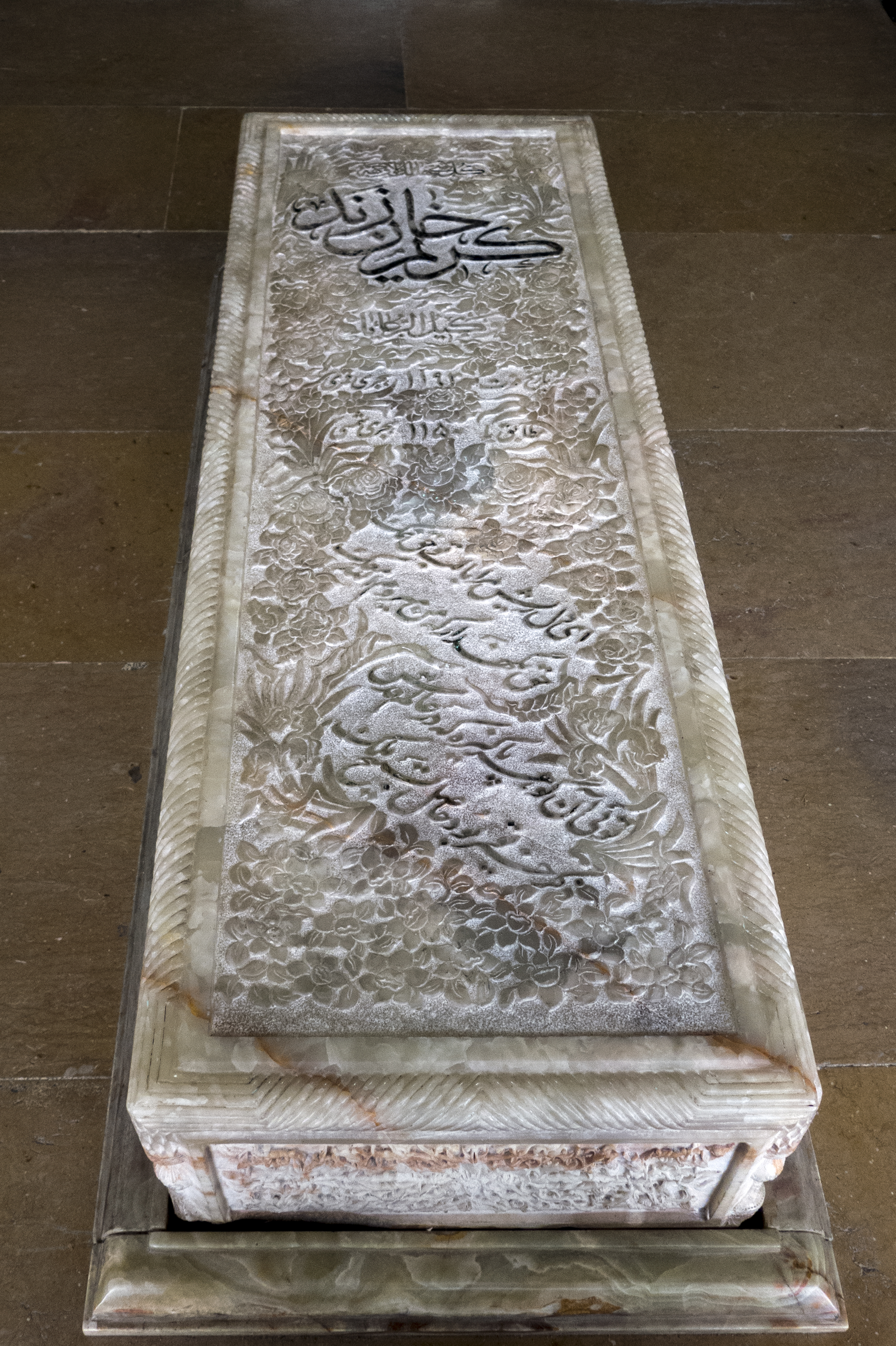
Grave of Karim Khan Zand

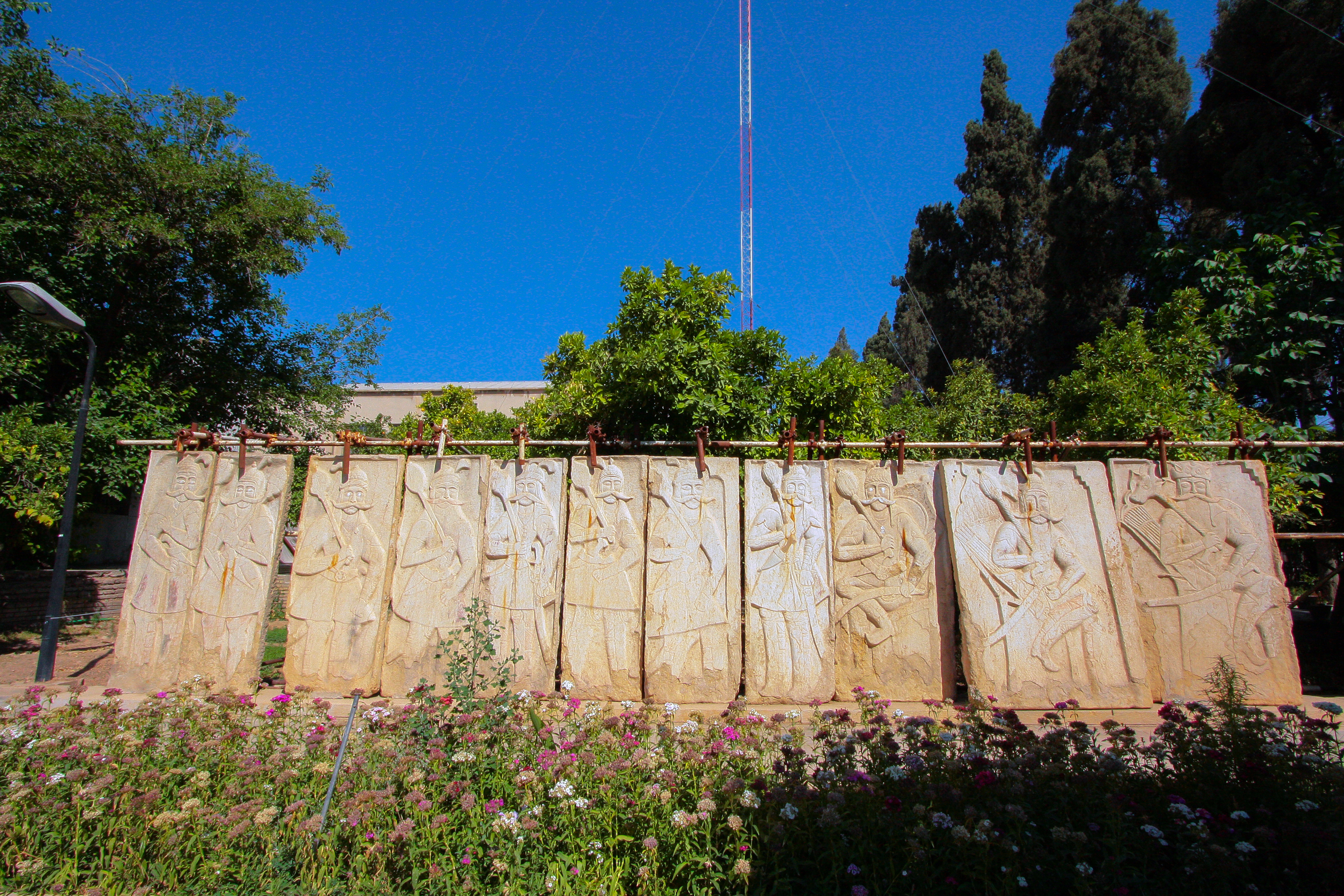
Stone work in the garden
