= Sissons =

Sissons may refer to:

- Sissons (surname)
- 5170 Sissons, main-belt asteroid
- J.H. Sissons School, elementary school in Yellowknife, Northwest Territories, Canada
- Sissons Corner, Virginia, community in the U.S. state of Virginia
- Sisson's Peony Gardens, Peony garden located in Rosendale, Wisconsin

== See also ==
- Sisson, a surname
