= Quadrant (instrument) =

Navigation instrument

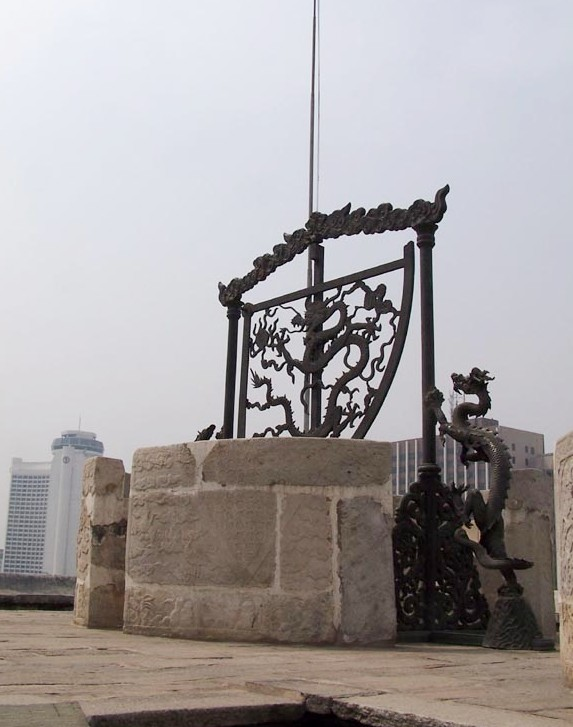
A large frame quadrant at the Beijing Ancient Observatory. It was constructed in 1673.

A quadrant is an instrument used to measure angles up to 90°. Different versions of this instrument could be used to calculate various readings, such as longitude, latitude, and time of day. It was first proposed by Ptolemy as a better kind of astrolabe. Several different variations of the instrument were later produced by medieval Muslim astronomers. Mural quadrants were important astronomical instruments in 18th-century European observatories, establishing a use for positional astronomy.

== Etymology ==
The term quadrant, meaning one fourth, refers to the fact that early versions of the instrument were derived from astrolabes. The quadrant condensed the workings of the astrolabe into an area one fourth the size of the astrolabe face; it was essentially a quarter of an astrolabe.

== History ==
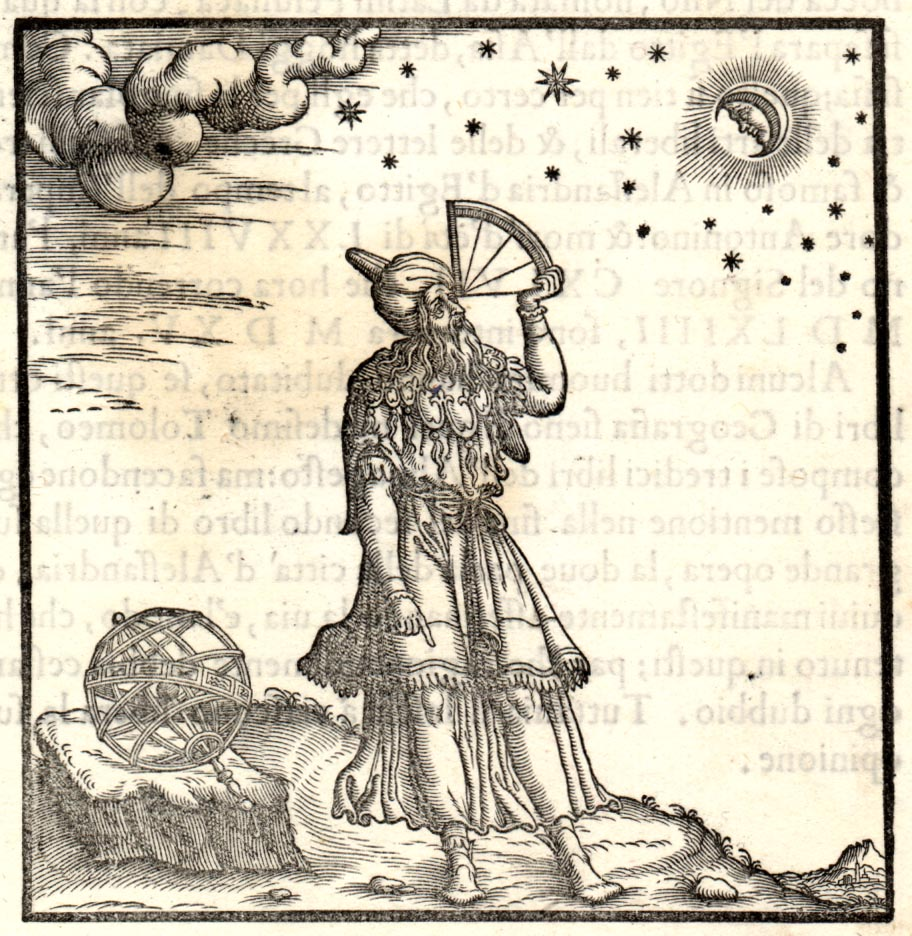
Ptolemy using a quadrant

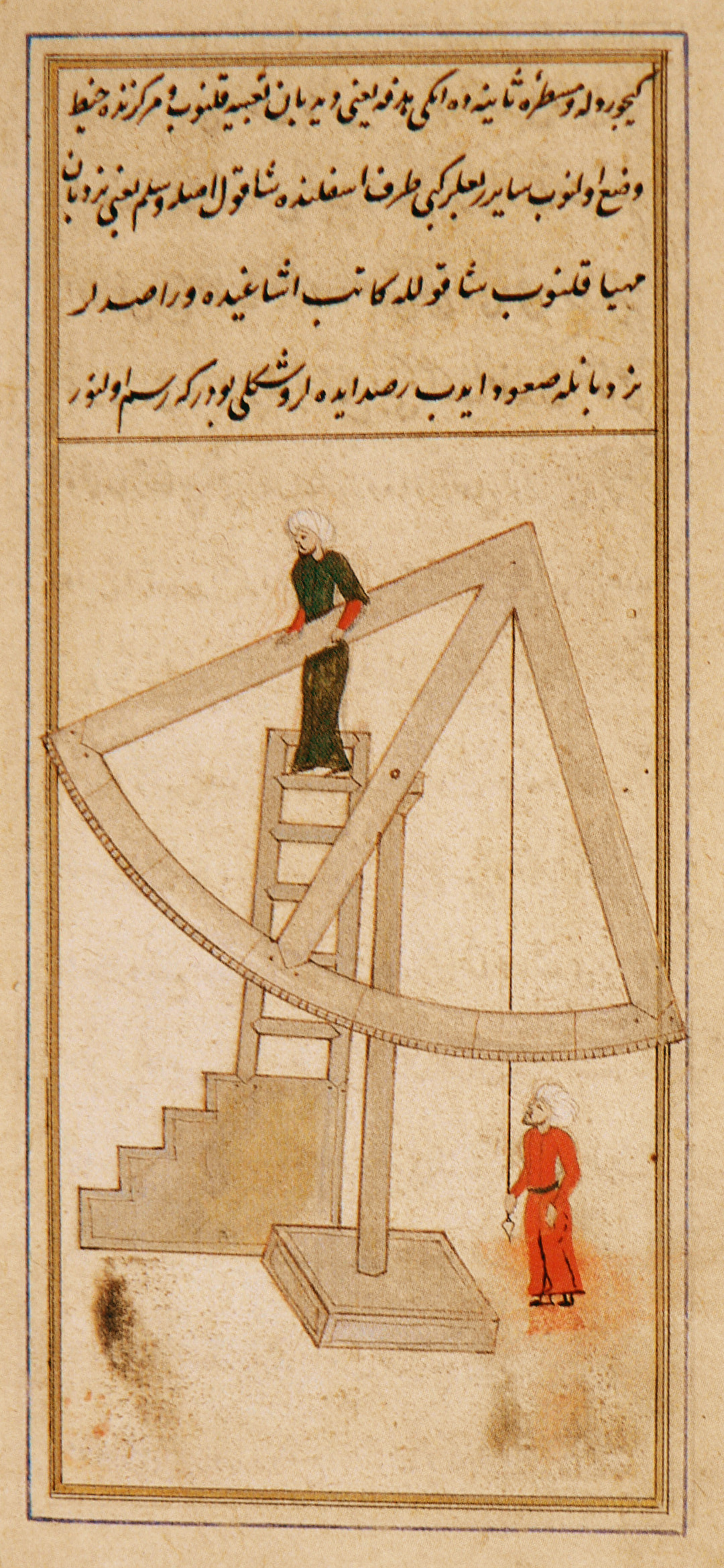
A quadrant in a Turkish illustration

During Rigvedic times in ancient India, quadrants called 'Tureeyam's were used to measure the extent of a great solar eclipse. The use of a Tureeyam for observing a solar eclipse by Rishi Atri is described in the fifth mandala of the Rigveda, most likely between c. 1500 and 1000 BC.

Early accounts of a quadrant also come from Ptolemy's Almagest around AD 150. He described a "plinth" that could measure the altitude of the noon sun by projecting the shadow of a peg on a graduated arc of 90 degrees. This quadrant was unlike later versions of the instrument; it was larger and consisted of several moving parts. Ptolemy's version was a derivative of the astrolabe and the purpose of this rudimentary device was to measure the meridian angle of the sun.

Islamic astronomers in the Middle Ages improved upon these ideas and constructed quadrants throughout the Middle East, in observatories such as Marageh, Rey and Samarkand. At first these quadrants were usually very large and stationary, and could be rotated to any bearing to give both the altitude and azimuth for any celestial body. As Islamic astronomers made advancements in astronomical theory and observational accuracy they are credited with developing four different types of quadrants during the Middle Ages and beyond. The first of these, the sine quadrant, was invented by Muhammad ibn Musa al-Khwarizmi in the 9th century at the House of Wisdom in Baghdad. The other types were the universal quadrant, the horary quadrant and the astrolabe quadrant.

During the Middle Ages the knowledge of these instruments spread to Europe. In the 13th century Jewish astronomer Jacob ben Machir ibn Tibbon was crucial in further developing the quadrant. He was a skilled astronomer and wrote several volumes on the topic, including an influential book detailing how to build and use an improved version of the quadrant. The quadrant that he invented came to be known as the novus quadrans, or new quadrant. This device was revolutionary because it was the first quadrant to be built that did not involve several moving parts and thus could be much smaller and more portable.

Tibbon's Hebrew manuscripts were translated into Latin and improved upon by Danish scholar Peter Nightingale several years later. Because of the translation, Tibbon, or Prophatius Judaeus as he was known in Latin, became an influential name in astronomy. His new quadrant was based upon the idea that the stereographic projection that defines a planispheric astrolabe can still work if the astrolabe parts are folded into a single quadrant. The result was a device that was far cheaper, easier to use and more portable than a standard astrolabe. Tibbon's work had a far reach and influenced Copernicus, Christopher Clavius and Erasmus Reinhold; and his manuscript was referenced in Dante's Divine Comedy.

As the quadrant became smaller and thus more portable, its value for navigation was soon realized. The first documented use of the quadrant to navigate at sea is in 1461, by Diogo Gomes. Sailors began by measuring the height of Polaris to ascertain their latitude. This application of quadrants is generally attributed to Arab sailors who traded along the east coast of Africa and often travelled out of sight of land. It soon became more common to take the height of the sun at a given time due to the fact that Polaris is not visible south of the equator.

In 1618, the English mathematician Edmund Gunter further adapted the quadrant with an invention that came to be known as the Gunter quadrant. This pocket-sized quadrant was revolutionary because it was inscribed with projections of the tropics, the equator, the horizon and the ecliptic. With the correct tables one could use the quadrant to find the time, the date, the length of the day or night, the time of sunrise and sunset and the meridian. The Gunter quadrant was extremely useful but it had its drawbacks; the scales only applied to a certain latitude so the instrument's use was limited at sea.

== Types ==
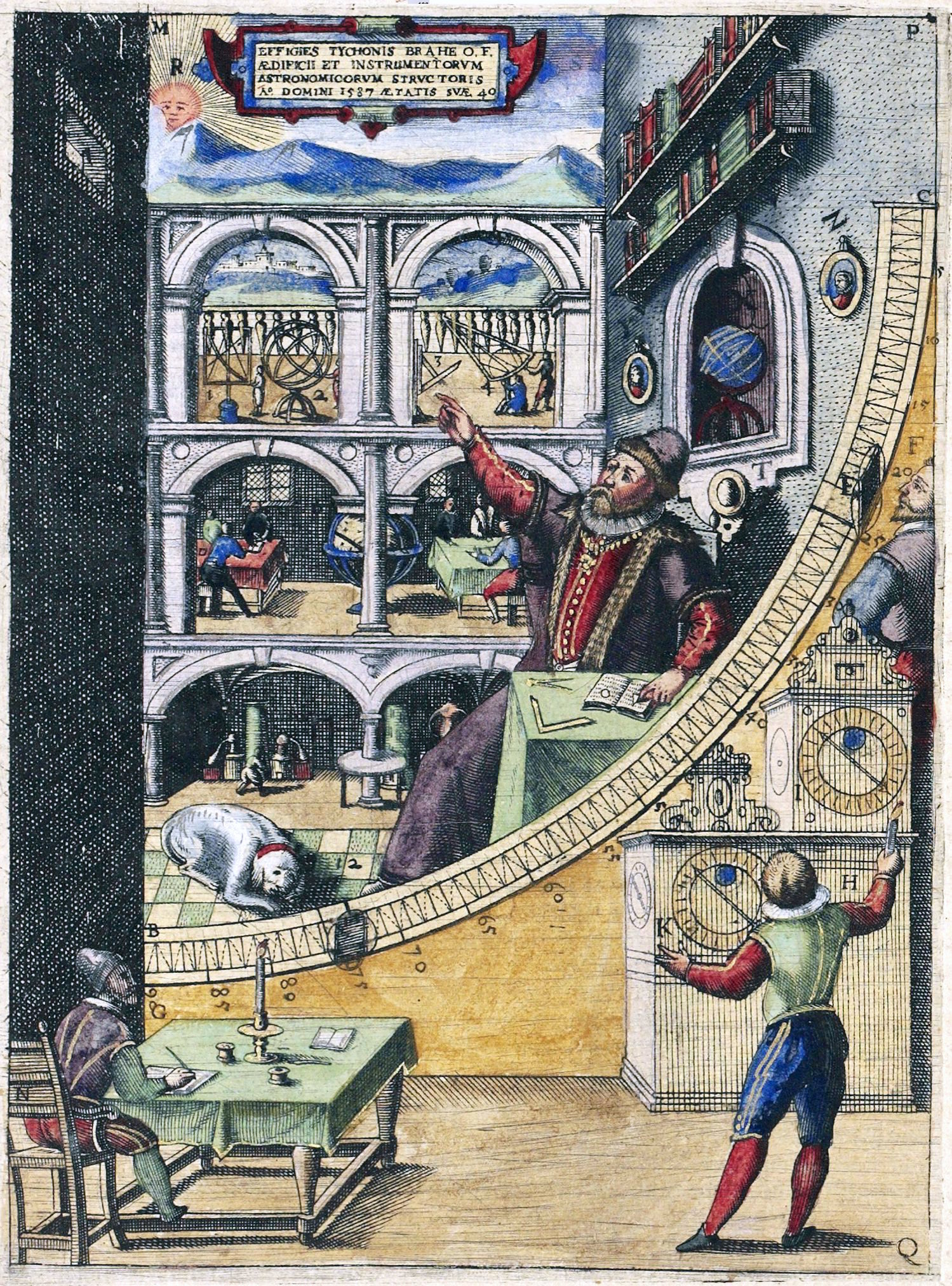
Engraving of Tycho Brahe's Mural quadrant in Uraniborg in 1598, picturing the two clocks.

There are several types of quadrants:

- Mural quadrants, used for determining the time by measuring the altitudes of astronomical objects. Tycho Brahe created one of the largest mural quadrants. In order to tell time he would place two clocks next to the quadrant so that he could identify the minutes and seconds in relation to the measurements on the side of the instrument.
- Large frame-based instruments used for measuring angular distances between astronomical objects.
- Geometric quadrant used by surveyors and navigators.
- Davis quadrant a compact, framed instrument used by navigators for measuring the altitude of an astronomical object.

They can also be classified as:

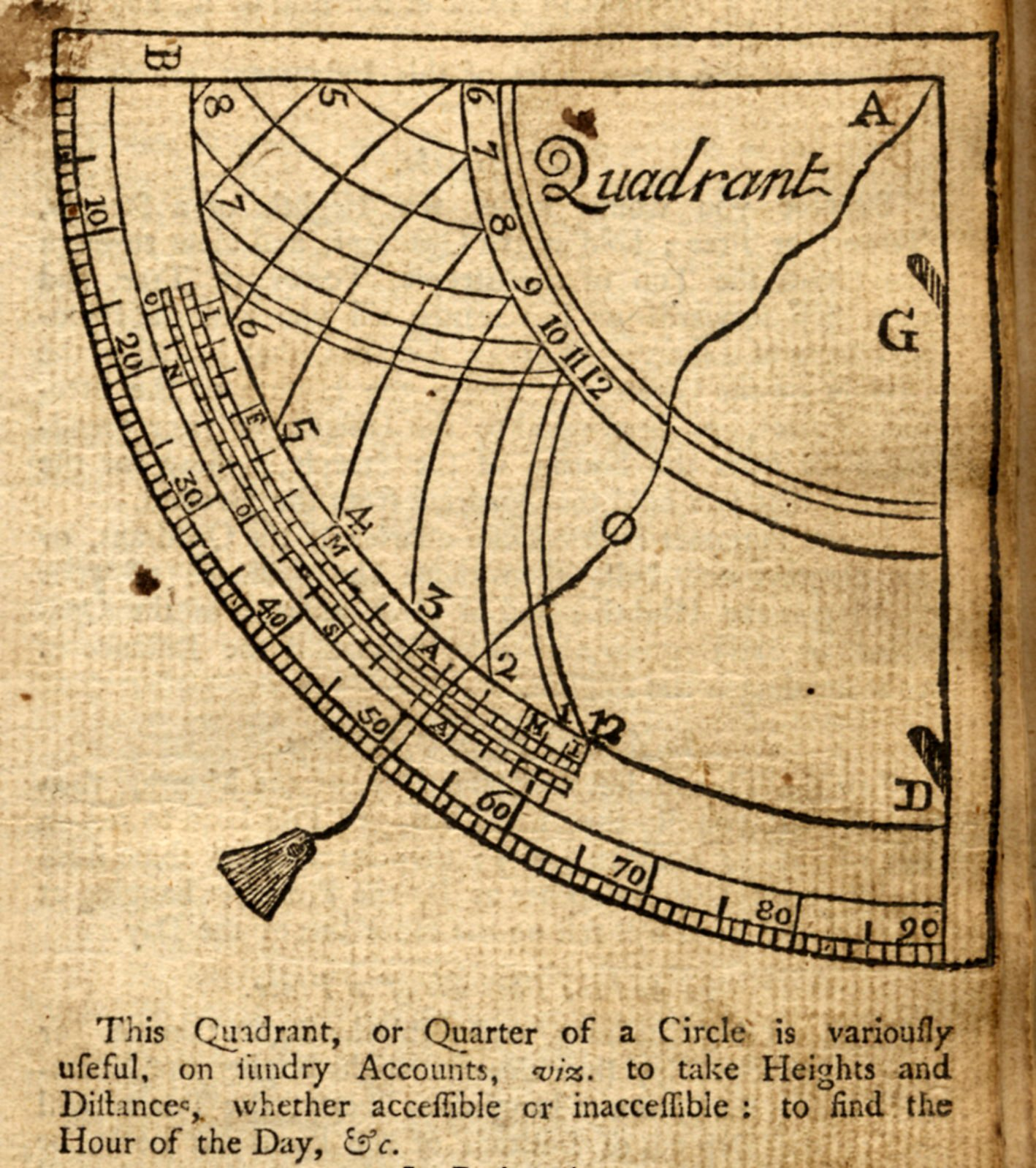
Horary quadrant for a latitude of about 51.5° as depicted in an instructional text of 1744: To find the Hour of the Day: Lay the thread just upon the Day of the Month, then hold it till you slip the small Bead or Pin-head [along the thread] to rest on one of the 12 o'Clock Lines; then let the Sun shine from the Sight G to the other at D, the Plummet hanging at liberty, the Bead will rest on the Hour of the Day.

- Altitude – The plain quadrant with plumb line, used to take the altitude of an object.
- Gunner's – A type of clinometer used by an artillerist to measure the elevation or depression angle of a gun barrel of a cannon or mortar, both to verify proper firing elevation, and to verify the correct alignment of the weapon-mounted fire control devices.
- Gunter's – A quadrant used for time determination as well as the length of day, when the sun had risen and set, the date, and the meridian using scales and curves of the quadrant along with related tables. It was invented by Edmund Gunter in 1623. Gunter's quadrant was fairly simple which allowed for its widespread and long-lasting use in the 17th and 18th centuries. Gunter expanded the basic features of other quadrants to create a convenient and comprehensive instrument. Its distinguishable feature included projections of the tropics, equator, ecliptic, and the horizon.
- Islamic – King identified four types of quadrants that were produced by Muslim astronomers.
1. The sine quadrant (Arabic: Rubul Mujayyab) – also known as the Sinecal Quadrant – was used for solving trigonometric problems and taking astronomical observations. It was developed by al-Khwarizmi in 9th century Baghdad and prevalent until the nineteenth century. Its defining feature is a graph-paper like grid on one side that is divided into sixty equal intervals on each axis and is also bounded by a 90 degree graduated arc. A cord was attached to the apex of the quadrant with a bead, for calculation, and a plumb bob. They were also sometimes drawn on the back of astrolabes.
2. The universal (shakkāzīya) quadrant – used for solving astronomical problems for any latitude: These quadrants had either one or two sets of shakkāzīya grids and were developed in the fourteenth century in Syria. Some astrolabes are also printed on the back with the universal quadrant like an astrolabe created by Ibn al-Sarrāj.
3. The horary quadrant – used for finding the time with the sun: The horary quadrant could be used to find the time either in equal or unequal (length of the day divided by twelve) hours. Different sets of markings were created for either equal or unequal hours. For measuring the time in equal hours, the horary quadrant could only be used for one specific latitude while a quadrant for unequal hours could be used anywhere based on an approximate formula. One edge of the quadrant had to be aligned with the sun, and once aligned, a bead on the plumbline attached to the centre of the quadrant showed the time of the day. A British version dated 1311 was listed by Christie's in December 2023, with the claim of being "the earliest dated English scientific instrument" without showing any provenance. A further example exists dated 1396, from European sources (Richard II of England). The oldest horary quadrant was found during an excavation in 2013 in the Hanseatic town of Zutphen (Netherlands), is dated ca. 1300, and is in the local Stedelijk Museum in Zutphen.
4. The astrolabe/almucantar quadrant – a quadrant developed from the astrolabe: This quadrant was marked with one half of a typical astrolabe plate as astrolabe plates are symmetrical. A cord attached from the centre of the quadrant with a bead at the other end was moved to represent the position of a celestial body (sun or a star). The ecliptic and star positions were marked on the quadrant for the above. It is not known where and when the astrolabe quadrant was invented, existent astrolabe quadrants are either of Ottoman or Mamluk origin, while there have been discovered twelfth century Egyptian and fourteenth century Syrian treatises on the astrolabe quadrant. These quadrants proved to be very popular alternatives to astrolabes.

== Geometric quadrant ==
Geometric quadrant with plumb bob.

The geometric quadrant is a quarter-circle panel usually of wood or brass. Markings on the surface might be printed on paper and pasted to the wood or painted directly on the surface. Brass instruments had their markings scribed directly into the brass.

For marine navigation, the earliest examples were found around 1460. They were not graduated in degrees but rather had the latitudes of the most common destinations directly scribed on the limb. When in use, the navigator would sail north or south until the quadrant indicated he was at the destination's latitude, turn in the direction of the destination and sail to the destination maintaining a course of constant latitude. After 1480, more of the instruments were made with limbs graduated in degrees.

Along one edge there were two sights forming an alidade. A plumb bob was suspended by a line from the centre of the arc at the top.

In order to measure the altitude of a star, the observer would view the star through the sights and hold the quadrant so that the plane of the instrument was vertical. The plumb bob was allowed to hang vertical and the line indicated the reading on the arc's graduations. It was not uncommon for a second person to take the reading while the first concentrated on observing and holding the instrument in proper position.

The accuracy of the instrument was limited by its size and by the effect the wind or observer's motion would have on the plumb bob. For navigators on the deck of a moving ship, these limitations could be difficult to overcome.

=== Solar observations ===
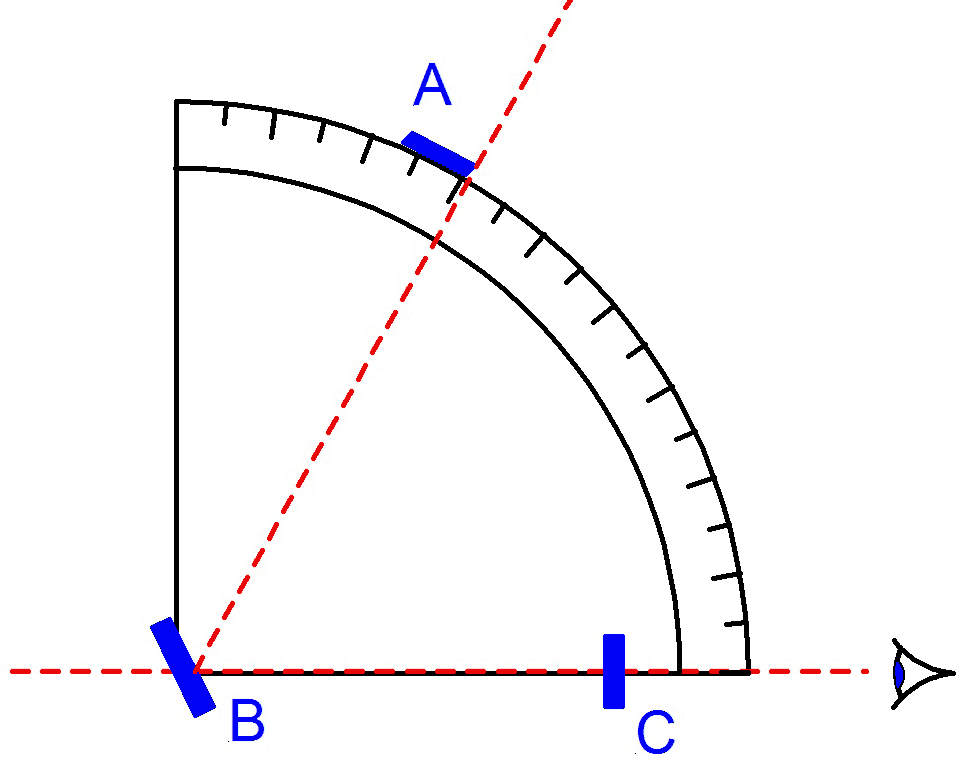
Drawing of a back observation quadrant. This instrument was used in the manner of a backstaff to measure the elevation of the sun by observing the position of a shadow on the instrument.

In order to avoid staring into the sun to measure its altitude, navigators could hold the instrument in front of them with the sun to their side. By having the sunward sighting vane cast its shadow on the lower sighting vane, it was possible to align the instrument to the sun. Care would have to be taken to ensure that the altitude of the centre of the sun was determined. This could be done by averaging the elevations of the upper and lower umbra in the shadow.

=== Back observation quadrant ===
In order to perform measurements of the altitude of the sun, a back observation quadrant was developed.

With such a quadrant, the observer viewed the horizon from a sight vane (C in the figure on the right) through a slit in the horizon vane (B). This ensured the instrument was level. The observer moved the shadow vane (A) to a position on the graduated scale so as to cause its shadow to appear coincident with the level of the horizon on the horizon vane. This angle was the elevation of the sun.

== Framed quadrant ==
Large-frame quadrants were used for astronomical measurements, notably determining the altitude of celestial objects. They could be permanent installations, such as mural quadrants. Smaller quadrants could be moved. Like the similar astronomical sextants, they could be used in a vertical plane or made adjustable for any plane.

When set on a pedestal or other mount, they could be used to measure the angular distance between any two celestial objects.

The details on their construction and use are essentially the same as those of the astronomical sextants; refer to that article for details.

Navy: Used to gauge elevation on ships cannon, the quadrant had to be placed on each gun's trunnion in order to judge range, after the loading. The reading was taken at the top of the ship's roll, the gun adjusted, and checked, again at the top of the roll, and he went to the next gun, until all that were going to be fired were ready. The ship's Gunner was informed, who in turn informed the captain...You may fire when ready...at the next high roll, the cannon would be fired.

In more modern applications, the quadrant is attached to the trunnion ring or of a large naval gun to align it to benchmarks welded to the ship's deck. This is done to ensure firing of the gun hasn't "warped the deck." A flat surface on the mount gunhouse or turret is also checked against benchmarks, also, to ensure large bearings and/or bearing races haven't changed... to "calibrate" the gun.

== Customization ==
During the Middle Ages, makers often added customization to impress the person for whom the quadrant was intended. In large, unused spaces on the instrument, a sigil or badge would often be added to denote the ownership by an important person or the allegiance of the owner.

== See also ==
- Davis quadrant
- Lind's Quadrant
- List of astronomical instruments
- Mural instrument
