= Sisson =

Sisson is a surname that appeared in rural England around West Riding, Yorkshire in the 15th century. Notable people with the surname include:

- C. H. Sisson (1914–2003), British writer
- Fred Sisson (1879–1949), United States Representative from New York
- Jeremiah Sisson (1720–1783), British instrument maker
- John Richard Sisson (born 1936), acting president of the Ohio State University
- Jonathan Sisson (1690–1749), British instrument maker
- Marshall Sisson (1897–1978), British architect
- Rosemary Anne Sisson (1923–2017), British writer and screenwriter
- Rufus Sisson (1890–1977), American college basketball player

== See also ==
- Sisson Documents, forged Russian documents which purported that Trotsky and Lenin were agents in the pay of the German government
- Sisson, California, now Mount Shasta, California, named after prominent land owner Justin Sisson
- Sissons (disambiguation)
