= Gerard Arnout Hasselaer =

Dutch burgomaster (1698–1766)

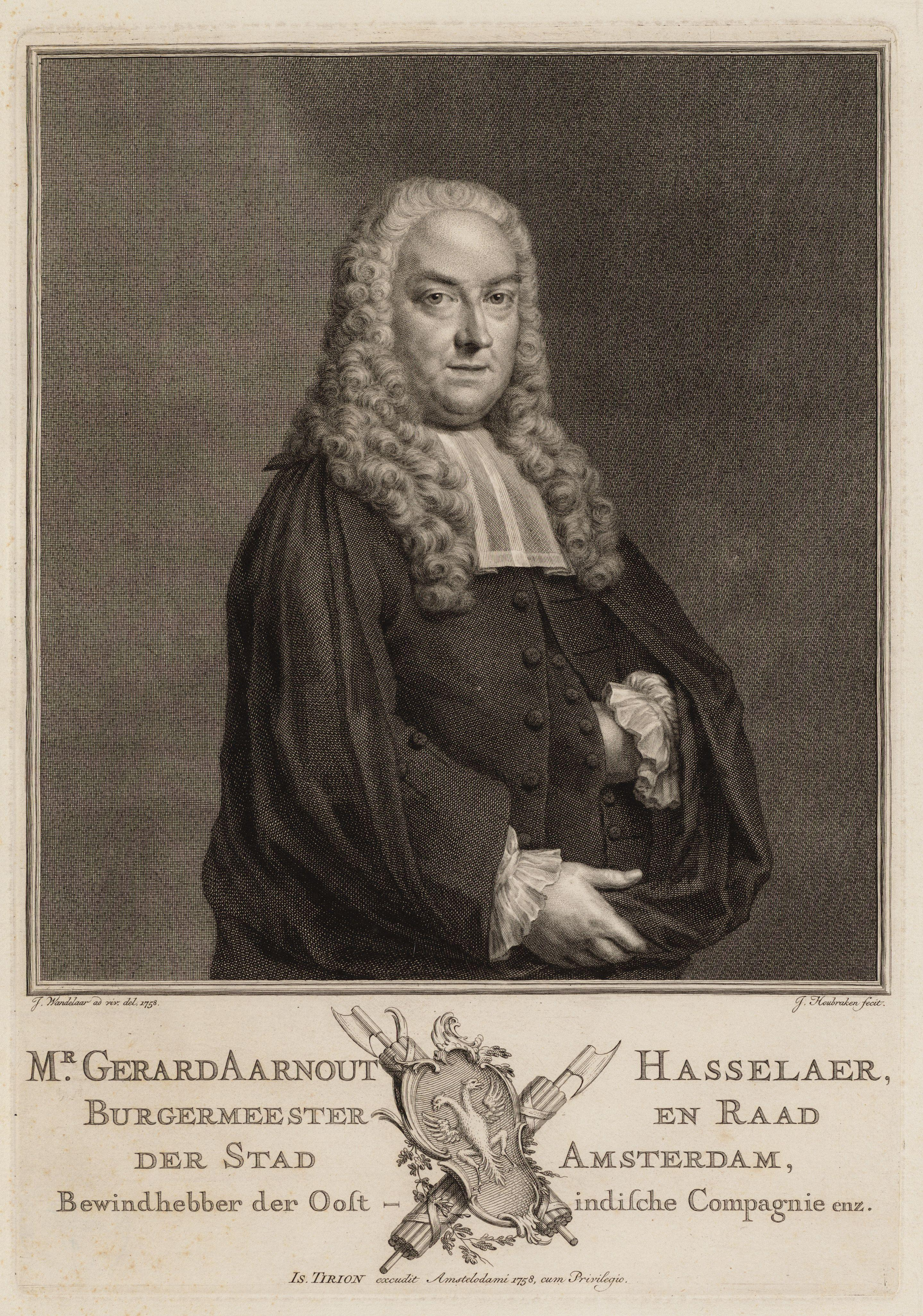
- Born: 1698
- Died: 1766 (aged 67–68)
- Known for: Director of the Dutch East India Company

Gerard Arnout Hasselaer (20 February 1698 in Amsterdam – 12 July 1766 in Heemstede) was a burgomaster and counsellor of the city of Amsterdam, and a Director of the Dutch East India Company.

Some historians have said he was an able regent. Others have said he was conservative and not truly capable. A contemporary, Gijsbert Jan van Hardenbroek, said he was "idle and preoccupied with his own pleasures." On 18 October 1748 Hasselaer was among the High and Mighty Lords of the States General of the United Provinces who were signatories to the Treaty of Aix-la-Chapelle (1748) which ended the War of the Austrian Succession. Hasselaer was a director of the Indian Council when, in December 1748, Joan Gideon Loten obtained a position as a Councillor extraordinary.

Hasselaer took an interest in navigation, and possessed a collection of scientific instruments. He represented William IV, Prince of Orange in three Dutch Admiralties. At this time the Dutch were trying to catch up with the English in navigational knowledge and skills, and Hasselaer assisted in this process. In 1757 John May (shipwright) was appointed. On his death Hasselaer left a collection of 266 objects, including navigational instruments. In November 1776 Utrecht University acquired an "extra fine octant in its case" made by Jonathan Sisson (c.1690-1747), a London-based maker of scientific instruments, from this collection. Hasselaer, as regent of Amsterdam, was in contact with Sisson and with his Amsterdam-based brother-in-law Benjamin Ayres, also an instrument maker. Jan Hope, his neighbor bought his estate in Heemstede.

== Bibliography ==
Inventories of Hasselaer's collection and his library were published for the auction of 1776.

- Hasselaer, Gerard Arnout (1776). Catalogus van eene zeer schoone verzameling van natuurkundige instrumenten ... nagelaten door Mr. G. A. Hasselaer, welke zullen verkogt worden... den 22 november 1776 door H. van Otterloo en J. van Schoonhoven. H. van Otterloo en J. van Schoonhoven.
- Hasselaer, Gerard Arnout (1776). Bibliothecae Hasselaerianae pars sive catalogus librorum praestantissimorum theologicorum, juridicorum: quibus usus est ... G. A. Hasselaer : quorum publica fiet auctio .. ad diem 18 novembris 1776. H. van Otterloo en J. van Schoonhoven.
