= Benjamin Ayres (instrument maker) =

English instrument maker (??–1775)

Benjamin Ayres (died c. 1775) was an English instrument maker.

Ayres may have been related to the scientist Thomas Ayres who was nominated to the Royal Society in 1707 and who was later involved in a joint-stock company to exploit the Newcomen steam engine. Ayres was an apprentice and brother-in-law of Jonathan Sisson of London.

Ayres was active between 1731 and 1775, making mathematical instruments and compasses. He worked in Amsterdam from 1743 onward, and sold octants to the Dutch East India Company. His devices incorporate technical innovations introduced by Sisson, which were copied by others only after 1750. Some of them were included in the collection of instruments made by Gerard Arnout Hasselaer, a board member of the company. Hasselaer had connections with both Ayres and Sisson.

In 1734 Caleb Smith invented a "sea quadrant" using an unsilvered glass mirror to reflect the image of the sun into the telescope. Ayres produced an instrument based on this design mounted on gimbals over a magnetic compass, with a spirit level for use when the horizon was not visible, the whole contained in a solid wooden case.

Around 1750 Ayres invented and made a sailors' arithmetical instrument, now held in the University Museum of Utrecht. It consisted of a brass disk on which a number of circular logarithmic scales were inscribed, with two radial wires that could each be locked to a point on the circumference. Using this instrument, a sailor could perform various trigonometric calculations by setting the wire to the position of the argument on one of the circular scales and reading the result from another of the circular scales.

Ayres made fine, large Azimuth compasses, used in determining how much the magnetic compass deviated from true north. A brass mariner's compass in gimbals set in a mahogany box, made by Ayres in Amsterdam around 1775, is said to have been the property of Sir Isaac Newton.
