= Sissons (surname) =

Sissons is a British surname.

Notable people who share this surname include:

- A. T. S. Sissons (1888–1975), Australian pharmaceutical scientist and academic
- Colton Sissons (born 1993), Canadian ice hockey player
- C. H. Sisson (1914–2003), British writer
- Graham Sissons (1934–2026), English footballer
- John Sissons (football) (born 1945) English footballer
- John Sissons (1892–1969), author, judge and Canadian federal politician
- Pat Sissons, a presenter on the Original 106 radio station
- Peter Sissons (1942–2019), British broadcast journalist
- Richard Sissons (1819–1893), New Zealand doctor
- Robert Sissons (born 1988 in Stockport), English footballer

== See also ==
- Sisson, a surname
