= Jeremiah Sisson =

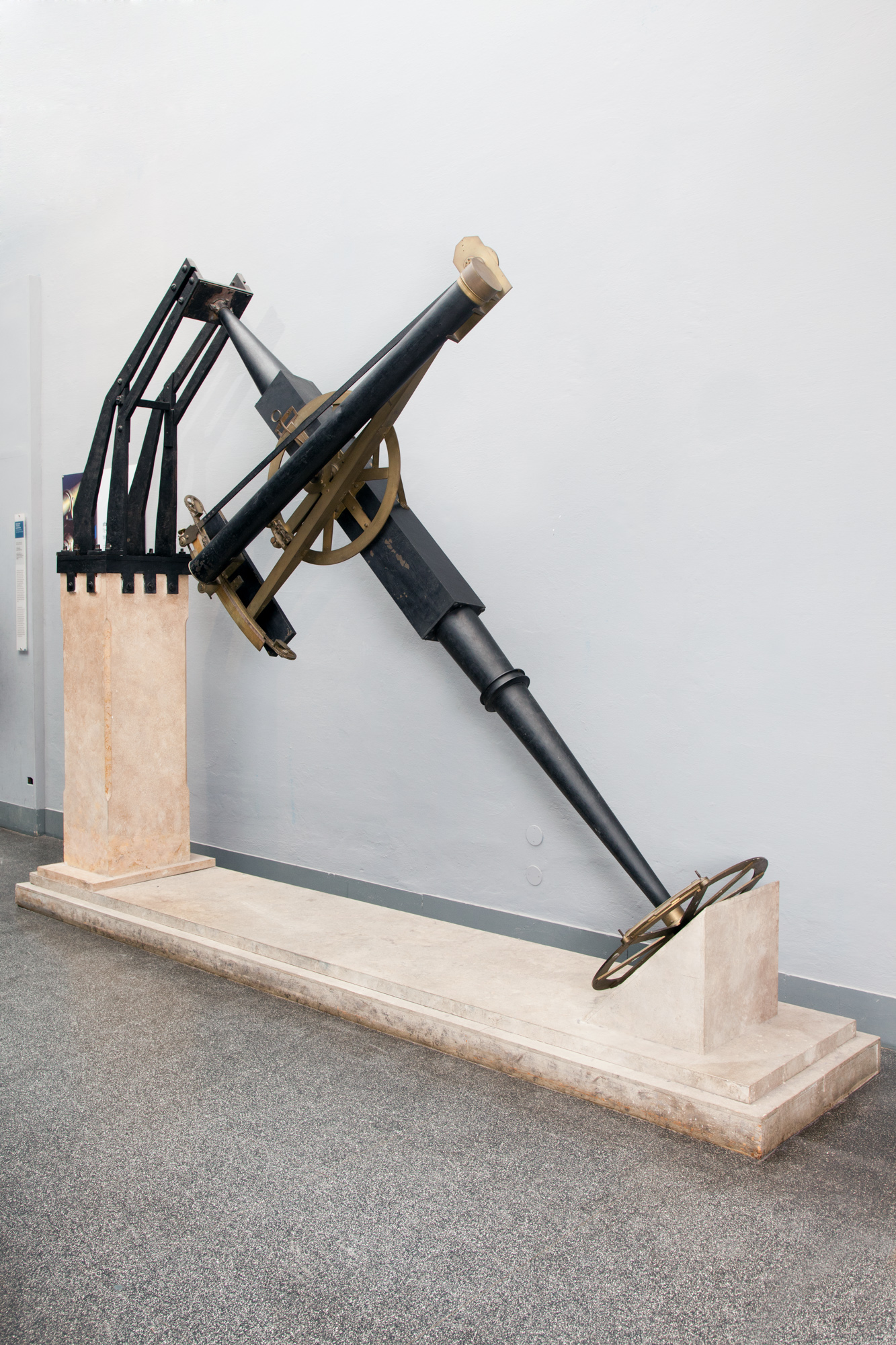
- Equatorial sector by Jeremiah Sisson (1774), exhibited at Museo nazionale della scienza e della tecnologia Leonardo da Vinci, Milan
- Born: 1720
- Died: 1783 (aged 62–63)
- Occupation: Instrument maker

Jeremiah Sisson (1720-1783) was an English instrument maker who became one of the leaders of his profession in London. Jeremiah Sisson was the son of Jonathan Sisson, also a respected instrument maker, who trained him in the craft.

Sisson worked at a time when demand from the Royal Observatory, Greenwich and the Ordnance Survey, and assistance from the Royal Society, had brought London instrument makers to a dominant position in supply of the technically demanding work of making instruments for astronomy, survey and navigation. Sisson's father also employed John Bird, another supplier of instruments to the Royal Observatory. Sisson employed Jesse Ramsden in his workshop, later to become a leading instrument maker in his own right. According to Jean Bernoulli, among the London instrument makers in 1769 Sisson ranked after John Bird but ahead of Ramsden in his skill.

Jeremiah Sisson supplied sectors and other astronomical instruments to Nevil Maskelyne, Astronomer Royal at the Greenwich Observatory. When Sisson went bankrupt, Maselyne gave him financial support. Sisson was not a good businessman. Lalonde said of him that he began too many projects but completed none. He was declared bankrupt in 1751. He was jailed several times when he failed to pay his employees. He had been forced to pawn some of his instruments to raise cash, and these instruments were later sold by the pawnbroker for much less than they were worth. In 1772 Sisson succeeded George Adams senior as supplier to the Board of Ordnance, but lost this business when he went bankrupt again in 1775.

In 1773 Greenwich bought two sectors from Sisson. An equatorial sector made by Sisson in 1774, with two lenses 10 centimetres (3.9 in) across and a long axis aligned to the North celestial pole, was still used in the Brera Astronomical Observatory in Milan (now exhibited at Museo nazionale della scienza e della tecnologia Leonardo da Vinci). Giovanni Schiaparelli discovered the asteroid Esperia with this telescope on 26 April 1861. Prince Carl Theodor, Elector Palatine, set up an observatory of the roof of his castle at Schwetzingen in 1764, directed by Christian Mayer (1719-1783). A 12 feet (3.7 m) zenith sector made by Sisson was set up there in 1778. Meyer wanted to buy other instruments in 1782, but Sisson was busy with other work and only agreed to make a 6 feet (1.8 m) transit. On 21 March 1783 Meyer received a contract for the transit, countersigned by Maskelyn and the astronomer Thomas Hornsby of Oxford, to be made and delivered for 145 1/2 guineas. Sisson died in 1783.
