= Jonathan Sisson =

English instrument maker and inventor

- Born: 1690; Lincolnshire, England
- Died: June 13, 1747 (aged 56–57); London, England
- Occupation: Instrument maker
- Known for: Invention of the modern theodolite

Jonathan Sisson (1690 – 1747) was an English instrument maker, the inventor of the modern theodolite with a sighting telescope for surveying, and a leading maker of astronomical instruments.

== Career ==
Jonathan Sisson was born in Lincolnshire around 1690. He was apprenticed to George Graham (1673–1751), then became independent in 1722. He remained an associate of Graham and of the instrument maker John Bird (1709–1776). All three were recommended by the Royal Society and received some funding from the state, which recognised the value of instruments both to the Royal Navy and to merchant ships.

After striking out on his own in 1722 and opening a business in the Strand in London, Sisson gained a reputation for making highly accurate arcs and circles, and for the altazimuth theodolites that he made to his own design. He became a well-known maker of optical and mathematical instruments. In 1729 Sisson was appointed mathematical instrument maker to Frederick, Prince of Wales. His apprentice John Dabney, junior, was an early instrument maker in the American colonies, who arrived in Boston in 1739. Sisson's son, Jeremiah Sisson (1720–1783), also made instruments, and became one of the leading instrument makers in London. Sisson also employed John Bird, his co-worker under Graham, who became another leading supplier of instruments to the Royal Observatory. His brother-in-law, Benjamin Ayres, apprenticed under Sisson and then set up shop in Amsterdam in 1743.

Jonathan Sisson died during the night on 13 June 1747. An old friend recording the fact in his diary described him as a man of extraordinary genius in making mathematical instruments.

== Instruments ==
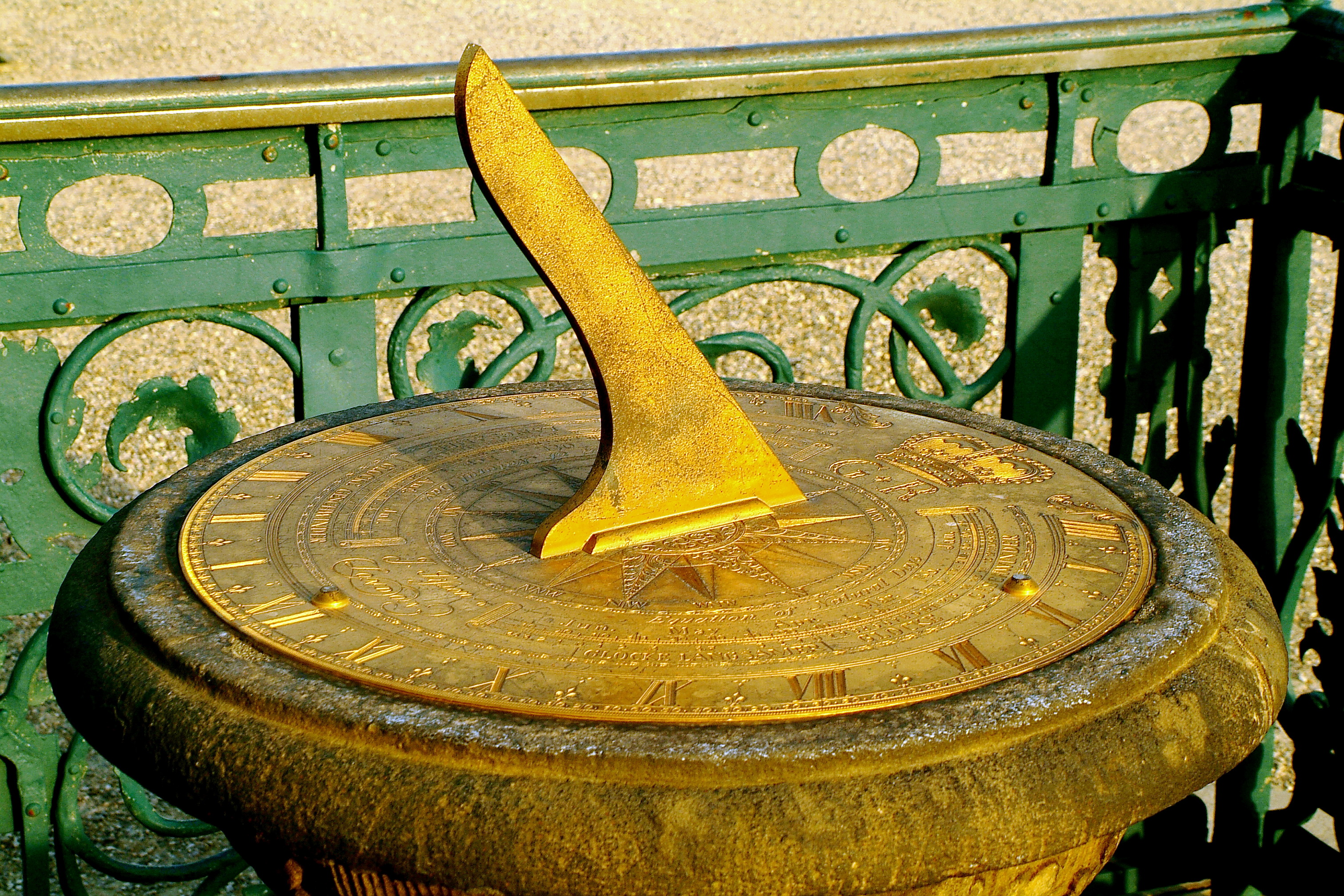
Sundial by Jonathan Sisson dated 1712 in the Großer Garten, Hannover, Germany

Sisson made portable sundials with a compass in the base for use in aligning the instrument with the Earth's axis. He also constructed barometers. A model Newcomen steam engine was given to Sisson to repair, but he was unable to make it work. (Note: The model Newcomen engine was later passed to James Watt, who first made it work, then made crucial improvements to the design that ushered in the age of steam.) However, Sisson became renowned for his instruments for surveying, navigation, the measurement of lengths and astronomy.

=== Surveying and navigation ===
Sisson designed an early type of surveyor's level, the Y-level (or Wye level), where a telescope rests in Y-shaped bearings and is removable. The level incorporates a bubble tube and a large magnetic compass. John Grundy, Sr. (c. 1696–1748), land surveyor and civil engineer, obtained a precision level with telescopic sights from Sisson before 1734. The instrument was accurate to less than 1 inch (25 mm) in 1 mile (1.6 km).

Sisson initially built theodolites with plain sights, then made the key innovation of introducing a telescopic sight. Sisson's theodolites have some similarity to earlier instruments such as that built by Leonard Digges, but in many ways are the same as modern devices. The base plate incorporates spirit levels and screws, so it can be leveled, and has a compass pointing to magnetic north. The circles are read using a vernier scale, accurate to about 5 minutes of arc. The design of his 1737 theodolite is the basis for modern instruments of this type.

The location of the boundary between the provinces of New York and New Jersey was long a source of violent disputes. In 1743, it was agreed that the line would run from the west bank of the Hudson River at the forty-first parallel to the bend of the Delaware River opposite today's Matamoras, Pennsylvania. There was no instrument in the Thirteen Colonies accurate enough to fix the location of the parallel precisely, so a request was forwarded to the Royal Society in London, and then to George Graham. Graham could not accept the commission due to other work, and recommended Sisson.

The 30 inches (760 mm) radius quadrant built by Sisson was found to be accurate within 1/120 of a degree, a very impressive level of accuracy.

The components of the instrument arrived in New Jersey in 1745 and assembly began the next year. After being used to determine the boundary and settle the dispute, the quadrant continued to be used for surveys in New Jersey and New York for many years.

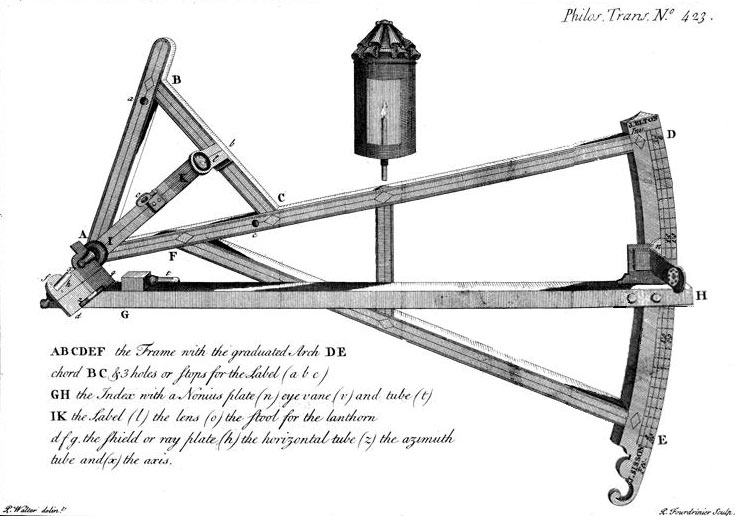
A drawing by John Elton of Elton's quadrant, which he patented in 1728. The backstaff is signed in the lower right corner: fecit J.Sisson (made by J. Sisson).

In 1732 Sisson was selected to make a brass octant to John Hadley's new design. The instrument proved reliable and easy to use in sea trials, even though weather conditions were poor, and was clearly an improvement over the cross-staff and backstaff. Joan Gideon Loten, an amateur scientist, owned an octant made by Sisson that he took with him on his assignment as Governor of the Dutch East Indian possession of Makassar (1744–1750). The instrument would have had considerable value at the time. He may have acquired it via Gerard Arnout Hasselaer, the regent of Amsterdam, who was in contact with Sisson and with his Amsterdam-based brother-in-law Benjamin Ayres, also an instrument maker.

=== Measurement of length ===
Sisson was well known for the exact division of his scales, for measuring lengths. In 1742 George Graham, who was a Fellow of the Royal Society, asked Sisson to prepare two substantial brass rods, well-planed and squared and each about 42 inches (1,100 mm) long, on which Graham very carefully laid off the length of the standard English yard held in the Tower of London. Graham also asked Sisson to prepare "2 excellent brass scales of 6 inches each, on both of which one inch is curiously divided by diagonal lines, and fine points, into 500 equal parts." These scales and other standard scales and weights were exchanged in 1742 between the Royal Society and the Royal Academy of Sciences in Paris, so each society had copies of the standard measures for the other country.

In 1785 the Royal Society heard a description of a brass standard scale made by Sisson under Graham's direction. The scale showed the length of the British standard yard of 36 inches (910 mm) from the Tower of London, and the lengths of the Exchequer's yard and the French half-toise. When compared to the Royal Society's standard yard at a temperature of 65 °F (18 °C) it was found to be precisely the same length, while it was almost 0.007 inches (0.18 mm) longer than the Exchequer yard.

=== Astronomy ===
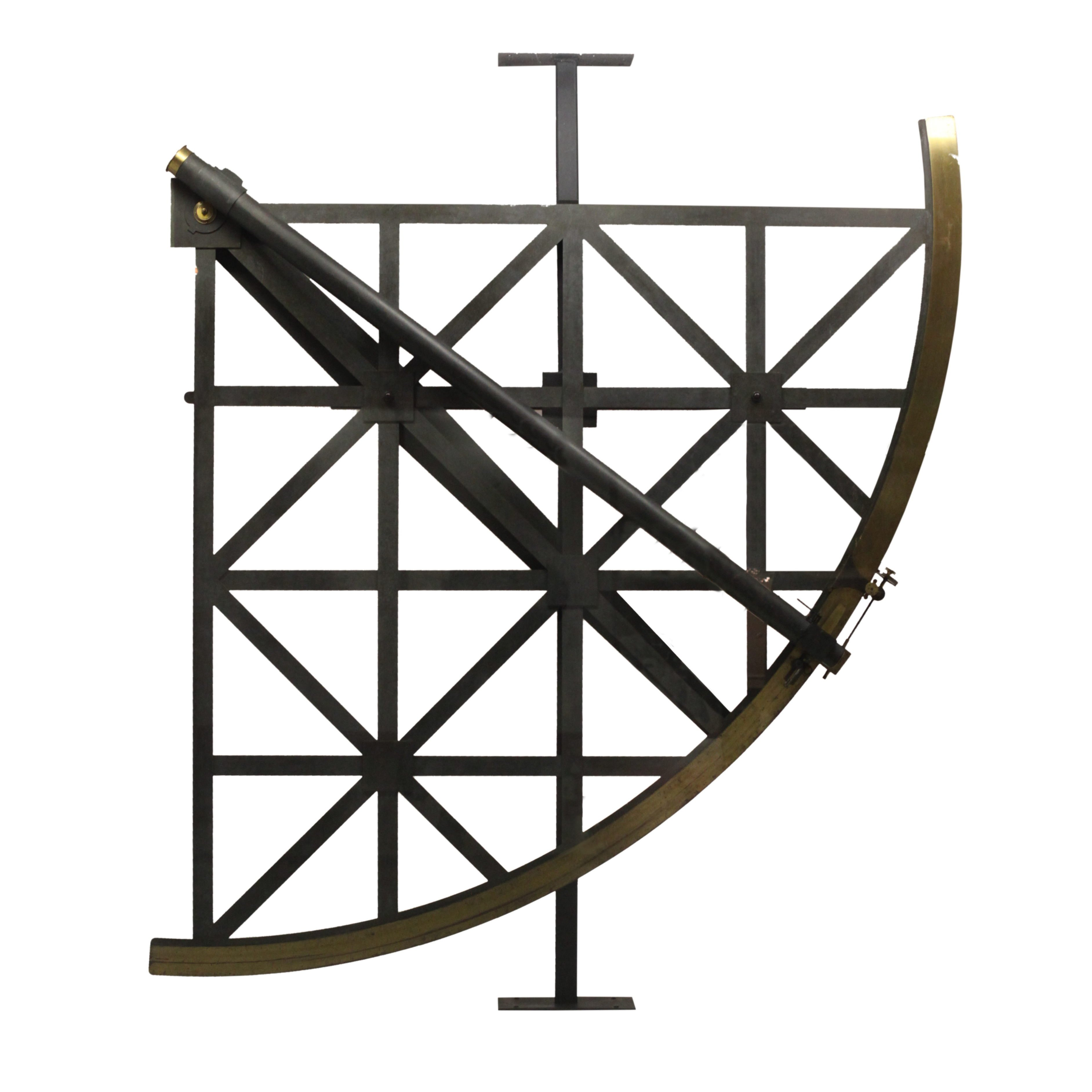
Mural quadrant by Jonathan Sisson. Brass, 1742. Classified as a Historic Monument. Used by Jérôme Lalande to measure the distance between the Earth and the Moon in 1751.

Sisson made large astronomical instruments that were used by several European observatories. He made rigid wall-mounted brass quadrants with radii of 6 to 8 feet (1.8 to 2.4 m). Graham employed Sisson to make the Royal Observatory's 8 feet (2.4 m) mural quadrant. One of Sisson's instruments was loaned by Pierre Lemonnier to the Berlin Academy, where it was used to supplement observations at the Cape of Good Hope by Nicolas Louis de Lacaille of the lunar parallax.

Pope Benedict XIV arranged for astronomical instruments purchased from Jonathan Sisson to be installed in the Specola observatory of the Academy of Sciences of Bologna Institute. With the help of Thomas Derham, the British ambassador in Rome, and of the Royal Society, Sisson was commissioned to supply a 3 feet (0.91 m) transit telescope, a 3 feet (0.91 m) mural quadrant, and a 2 feet (0.61 m) portable quadrant, which were dispatched by sea to Leghorn and installed in 1741 in the Institute's observatory. The arch and the latticework frame of the mural quadrant were both of brass, the first of this type.

A discussion of equatorial instruments (Note: An equatorial instrument is a device for measuring the position of a celestial object relative to a position on the earth's equator. With early designs the observer lined up sights on the object. Later instruments included a telescope.) published in 1793 said that Sisson was the inventor of the modern version of that instrument, which had been incorrectly attributed to Mr. Short. Sisson made his first equatorial instrument of this design for Archibald, Lord Ilay, and it was now held by the college at Aberdeen. The instrument was "very elegantly constructed", with an azimuth circle about 2 feet (0.61 m) across. Mr Short ordered Sisson's son Jeremiah to add reflecting telescopes to the instruments and to use endless screws to move the circles, but this design proved inferior to Jonathon Sisson's original.

Sisson's equatorial mounting design had first been proposed in 1741 by Henry Hindley of York. The telescope was attached to one side of a square polar axis, near the upper end of the axis, balanced by a weight on the other side. A similar arrangement is used in some telescopes today. His transit telescope used a hollow-cone design for its axis, a design adopted by later instrument makers such as Jesse Ramsden (1735–1800).

== Honours ==
Sisson Rock in Antarctica is named after Jonathan Sisson.
