= John Bird (astronomer) =

British mathematical instrument maker

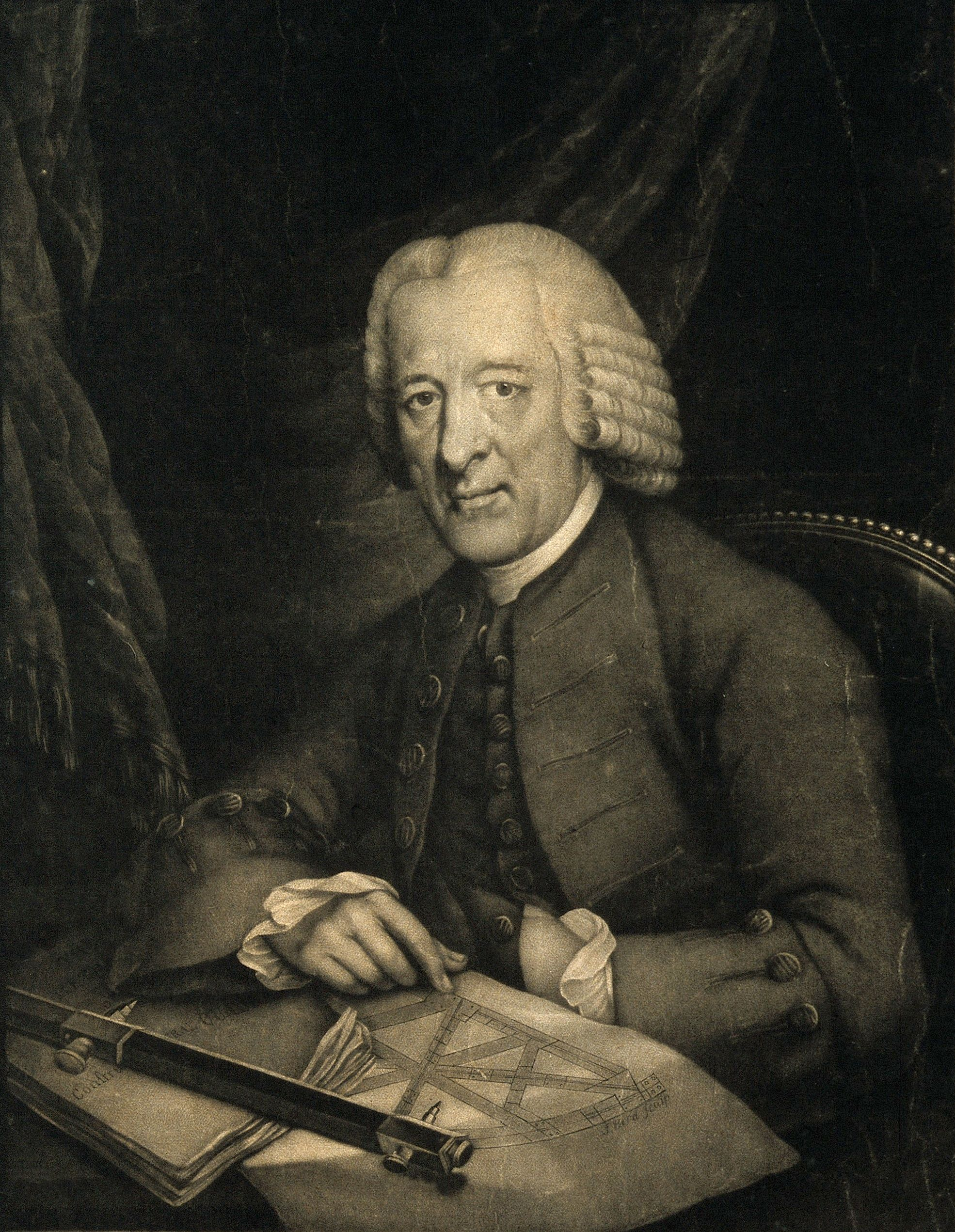
- Engraving of Bird by Valentine Green. Shows a beam compass used for engraving instruments.
- Born: John Bird c..1709 Bishop Auckland, England
- Died: 31 March 1776 (aged 66–67); Strand, London, United Kingdom
- Occupations: Inventor, Astronomer
- Known for: Maker of astronomical instruments

John Bird (1709– 31 March 1776) was a British mathematical instrument maker with an interest in astronomy who was notable for making high quality mural quadrants, octants, and sextants. Nevil Maskelyne used sextants made by Bird that had telescopes specially made by John Dollond and his son Peter.

== Life and work ==
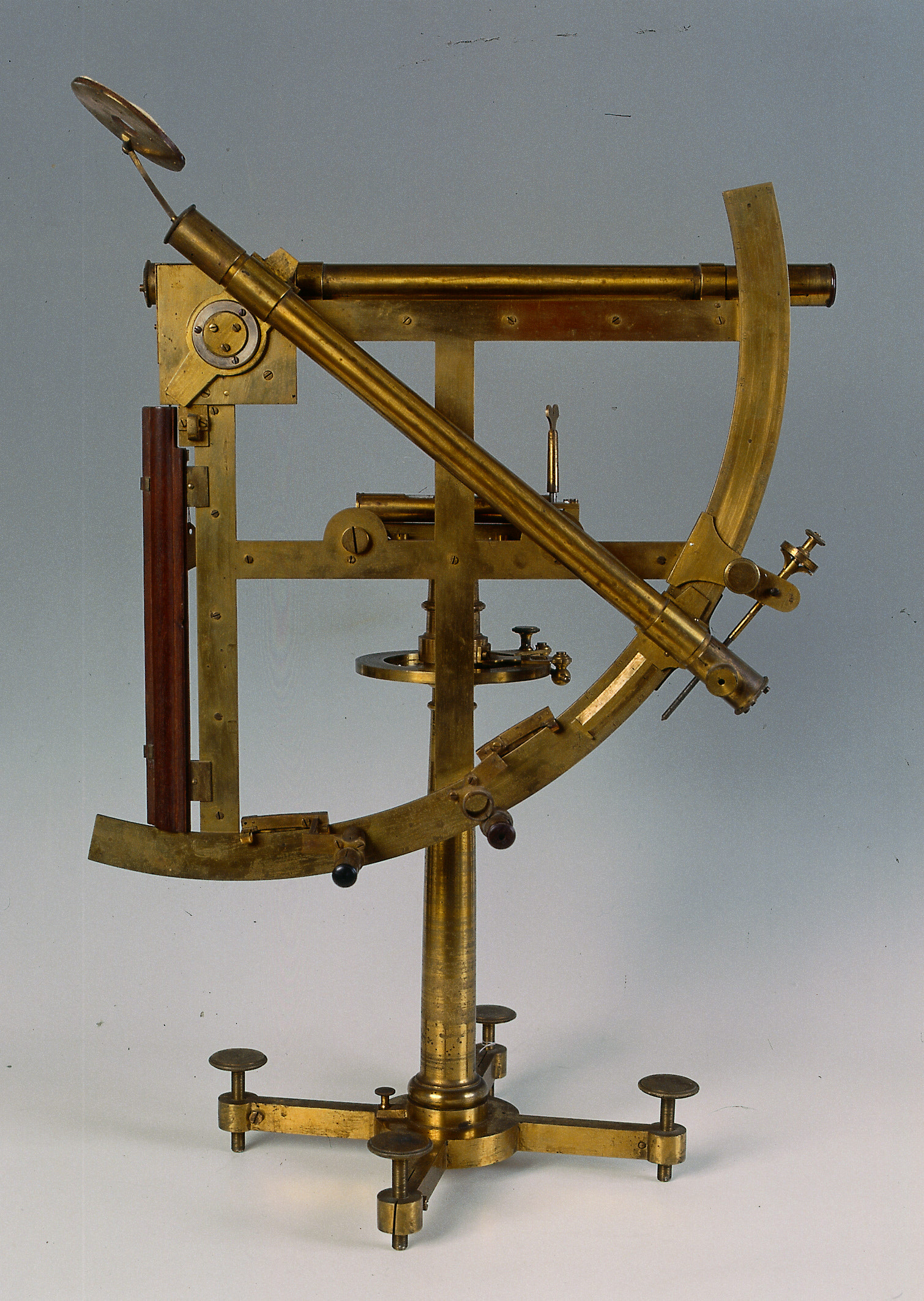
John Bird, Quadrante, Museo Civico di Modena

Bird was born in Bishop Auckland, County Durham and initially worked as a weaver. He became interested in the marking of divisions on clock dials and began to experiment on it and developed the skills. He became a friend of the mathematician William Emerson and he was able to recommend Jeremiah Dixon as a choice for the Woolwich Academy to send to St. Helena to study the transit of Venus. He came to London in 1740 where he worked for Jonathan Sisson (and his son Jeremiah) and later George Graham. By 1745, he had his own business was at the sign of Sea Quadrant, Court Garden, in the Strand. Bird was commissioned to make a brass quadrant 8 feet across for the Royal Observatory at Greenwich, where it was mounted on 16 February 1750, and where it is still preserved. Soon after, duplicates were ordered for France, Spain and Russia. The quadrant was considered to be of great quality as three years later it was off by just 0.5 minutes of the degree despite the temperature effects on metals. In 1764 Bliss and Bird made measurements of the diameter of the moon using a 2-foot reflecting telescope. Thomas Hornsby hired Bird to make instruments for the Radcliffe Observatory, Oxford, and his Equatorial Sector is one of the few that still exists. Along with Captain John Campbell, he designed portable sextants for use at sea.

Bird supplied the astronomer James Bradley with further instruments of such quality that the commissioners of longitude paid him £500 (a huge sum) on condition that he take on an apprentice for 7 years and produce in writing upon oath, a full account of his working methods. This was the origin of Bird's two treatises The Method of Dividing Mathematical Instruments (1767) and The Method of Constructing Mural Quadrants (1768). Both had a foreword from the astronomer-royal Nevil Maskelyne. When the Houses of Parliament burned down in 1834, the standard yards of 1758 and 1760, both constructed by Bird, were destroyed.

Bird, with his fellow County Durham savant William Emerson, makes an appearance in Mason & Dixon, the acclaimed novel by Thomas Pynchon.

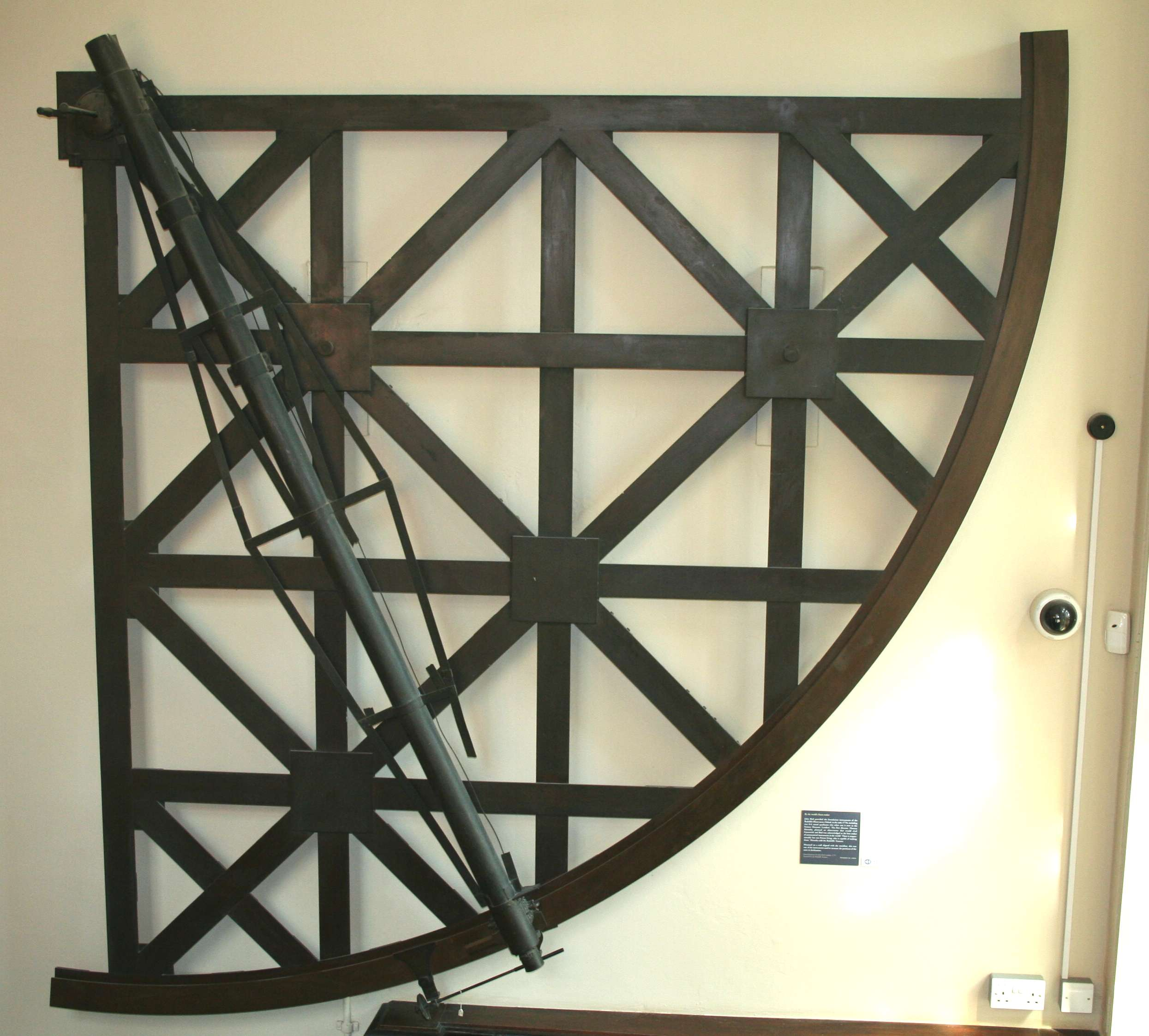
Mural quadrant constructed as a frame mounted on a wall. This instrument was made by Bird in 1773 and is in the History of Science Museum, Oxford
