= Sine quadrant =

Type of quadrant used by medieval Arabic astronomers

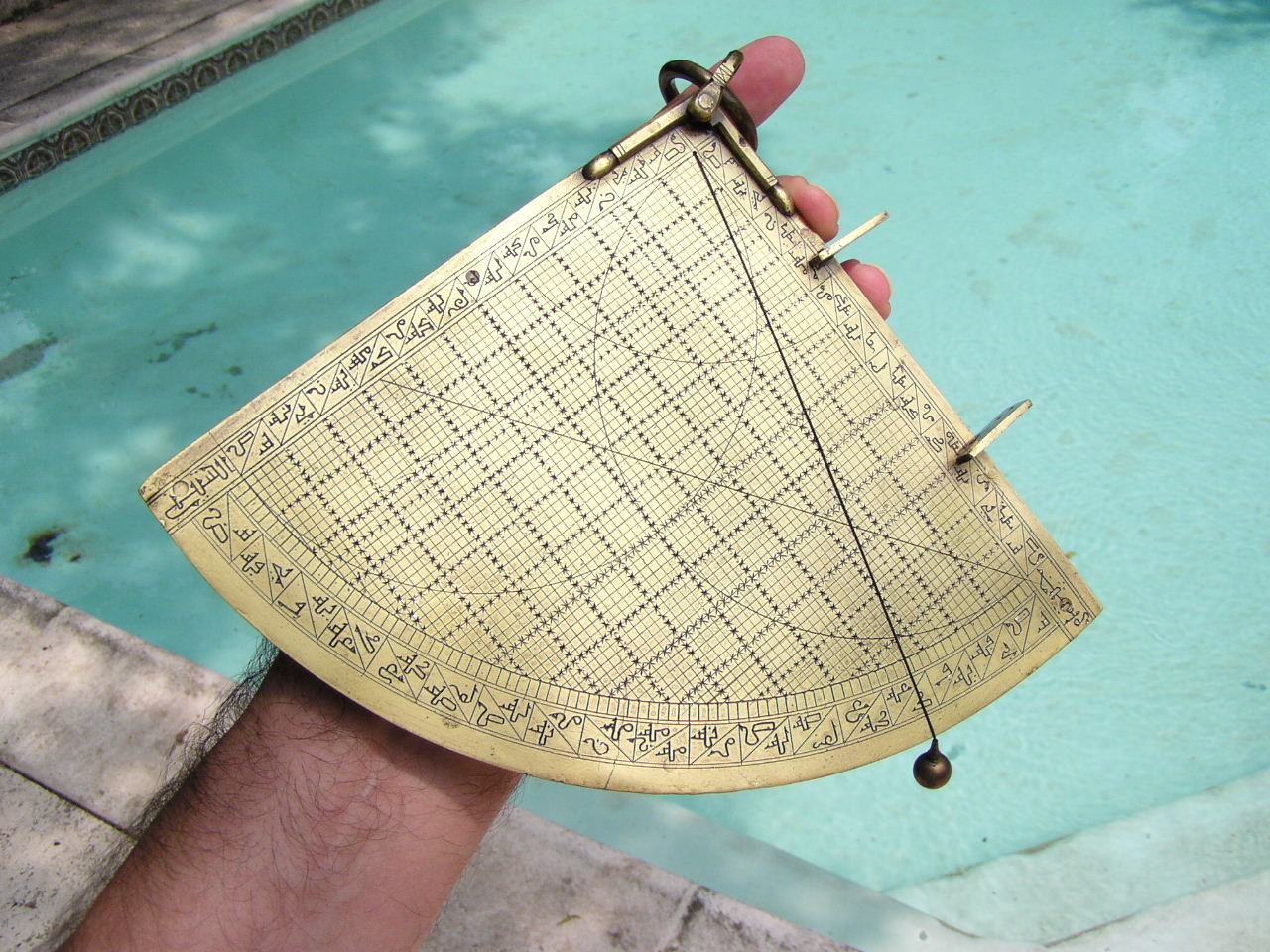
A sine quadrant, known in Arabic as rub‘ul mujayyab

A sine quadrant (Arabic: الربع المجيب, romanized: rub‘ul mujayyab), sometimes known as a "sinecal quadrant", was a type of quadrant used by medieval Arabic astronomers. The instrument could be used to measure celestial angles, tell time, find directions, perform trigonometric computations, and determine the apparent positions of any celestial object for any time. The name is derived from the Arabic rub meaning 'a quarter' and mujayyab meaning 'marked with sine'.

The sine quadrant was described by Muhammad ibn Mūsā al-Khwārizmī in 9th-century Baghdad, and was used throughout the medieval Islamic period to determine the proper times for Islamic prayer. These instruments, with poor angular resolution, were not principally intended to function with stars at night as an astronomical measuring device. It is impractical to sight a star through the front aperture unless it is on a fixed, stabilized mount relative to the half degree width of a very intense Sun.

== Description ==
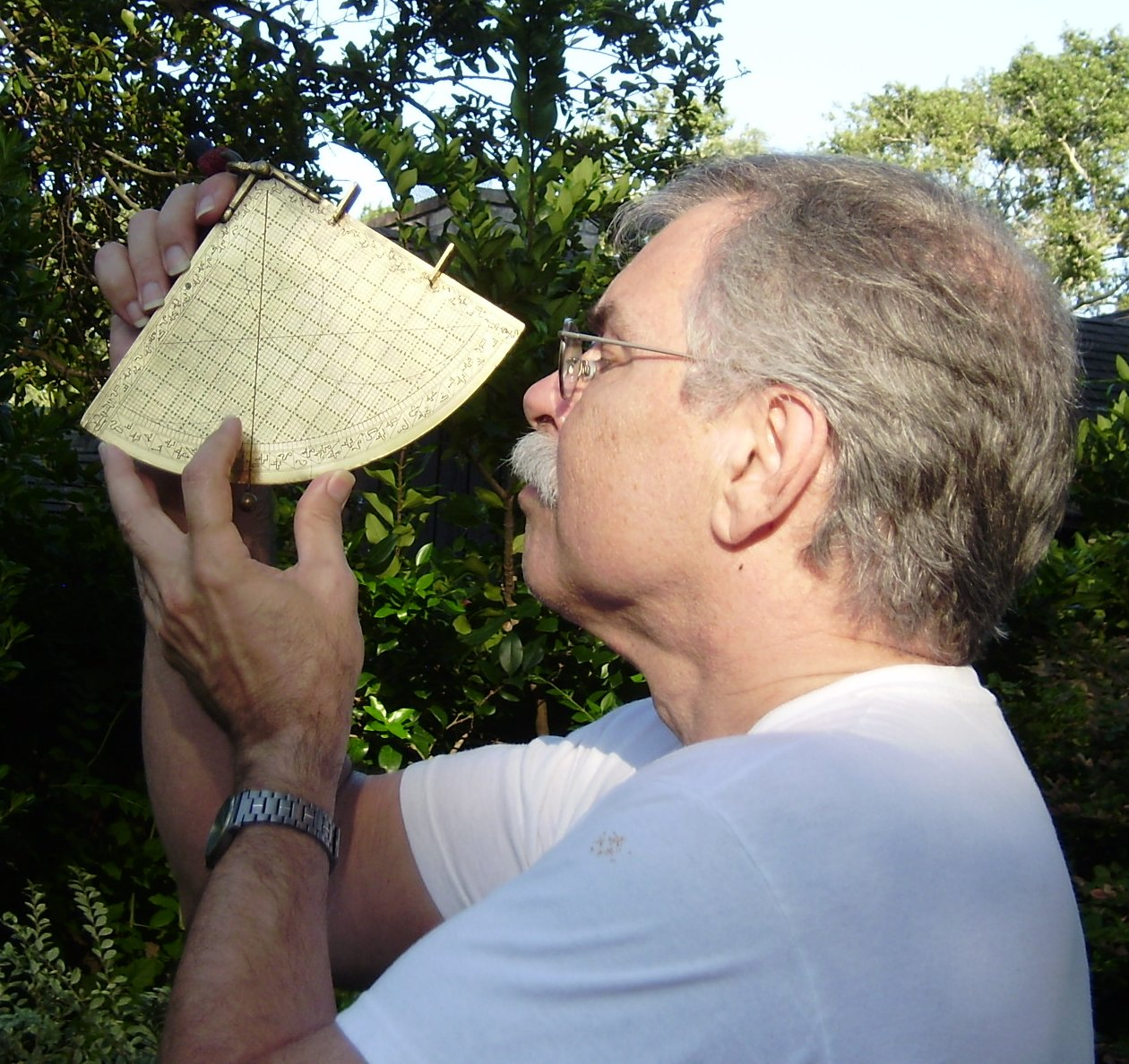
Using the sine quadrant to measure the altitude of a celestial object. Note the index finger of the left hand ready to pin the cord to the quadrant as soon as the star sight is perfected.

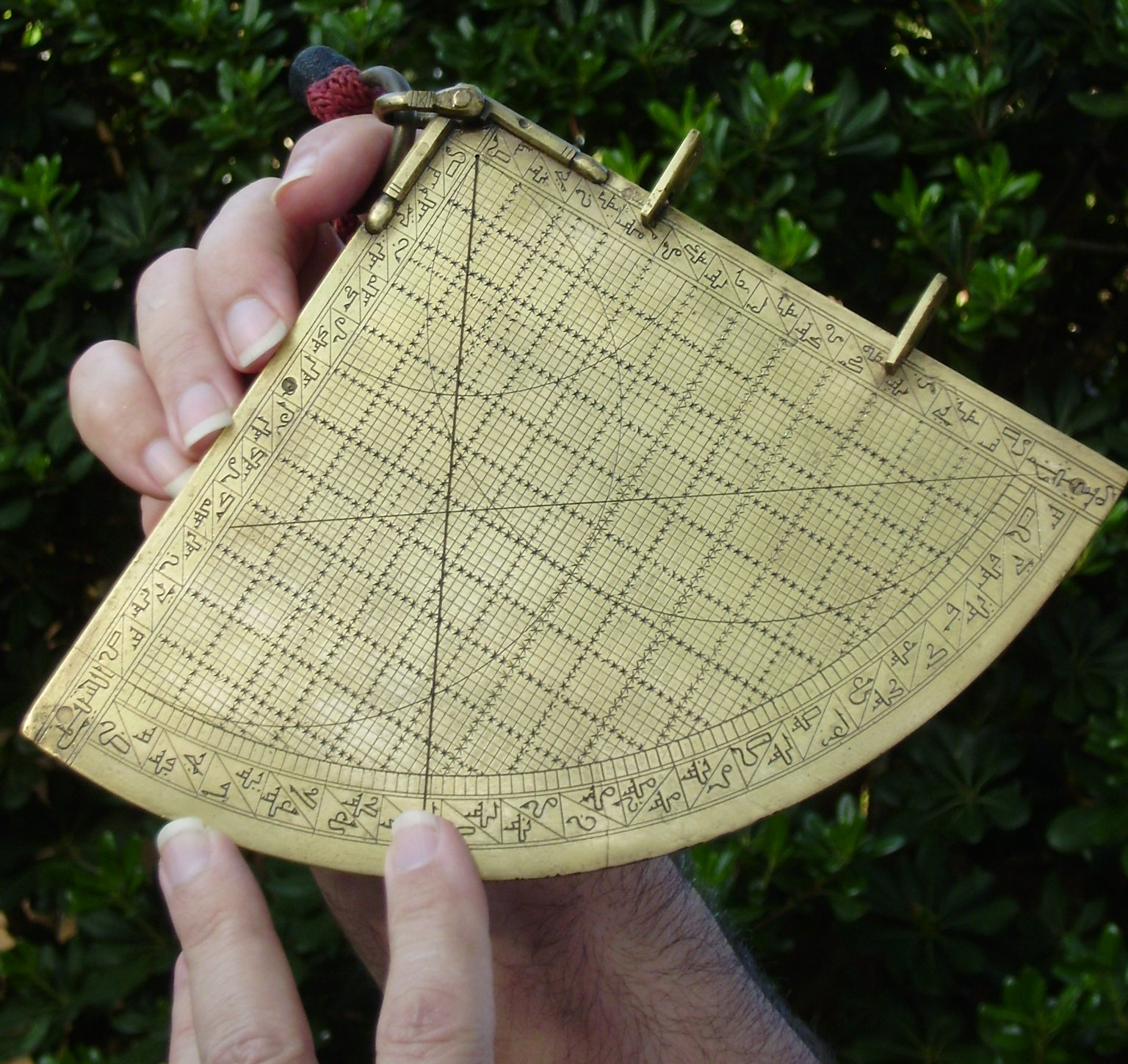
Reading the scale after taking the celestial altitude.

The instrument is a quarter of a circle made of wood or metal (usually brass) divided on its arc side into 90 equal parts or degrees. The 90 divisions are gathered in 18 groups of five degrees each and are generally numbered both ways from the ends of the arc. That is, one set of numbers begins at the left end of the arc and counts up to 90 at the right end, while the other starts on the right and the 90 is at the left. This double numbering enables the instrument to measure either celestial altitude or zenith distance or both simultaneously.

At the apex—where the two graduated straight sides of the grid pattern meet in a right angle—is a thin cord strung through a pin hole and weighted with a small bead. The cord is called a khait and is used as a plumb line when measuring celestial altitudes. It is also used to indicate angles when doing calculations with the instrument; the sliding bead facilitates trigonometric calculations. This plumb line serves two functions: first, it indicates the angular orientation of the instrument, and second, it ensures the instrument is parallel to the vertical plane (perpendicular with the ground) when optically aligned with the target.

Traditionally, the line from the beginning of the arc to the apex is called the jaibs and the line from the end of the arc to the apex is called the jaib tamams. Because the arc is numbered in both directions, these labels are not attached to one straight side or the other, but are instead relative to the measurement or calculation being performed.

Like the arc, both the jaibs and jaib tamams are divided into 60 equal units gathered in groups of five, numbered in both directions to and from the apex. The sixty lines parallel to the jaibs are called sitheeniys or sixtys, and the sixty lines parallel to the jaib tamams are called juyoobul mabsootah. The reason for sixty divisions along the jaibs and jaib tamams is that the instrument uses the sexagesimal number system. It is graduated to the number base 60 and not to the base 10 (decimal system) presently used. Time, angular measurement, and geographical coordinate measurements are about the only holdovers from the Sumerian/Babylonian number system that are still used.

On one of the straight edges of the non-maritime quadrant (solid sheet form) are two alignment plates called hadafatani, each with a small central aperture (pinhole). These two apertures form an optical axis through which the user sights an inclined object, such as a star at night.

The maritime (navigation) version of these devices is skeletal in design rather than a solid sheet form, so as to limit buffeting or movement of the instrument from wind while in the operator's hand.

== Measuring the Sun's altitude ==
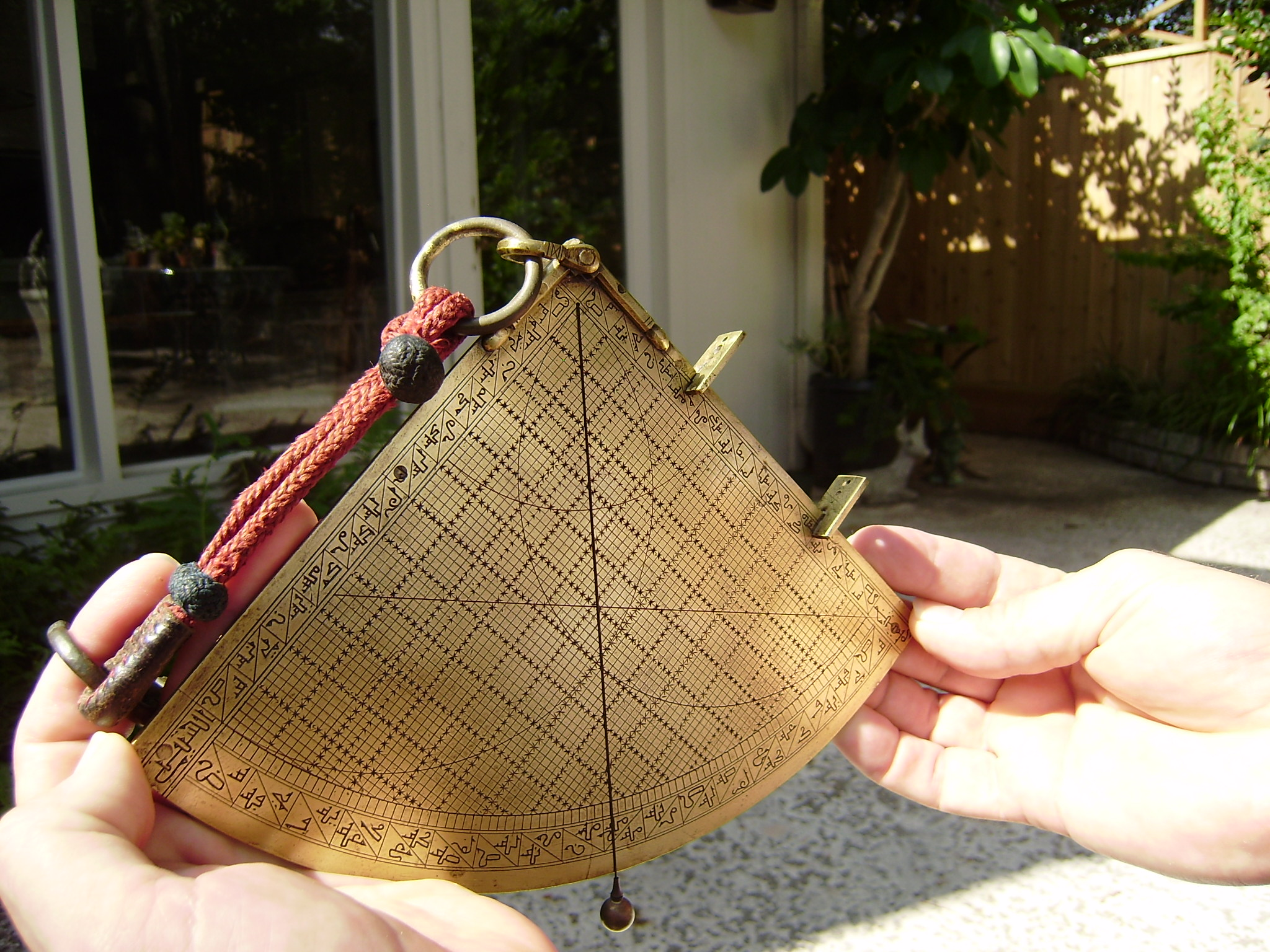
Taking the altitude of the Sun with the sinecal quadrant. Note shadow of sight vane with dot of sunlight on index finger of observer.

During the day, the Sun's altitude can be determined by aligning the apertures such that sunlight passes through both and projects a bright illuminated dot onto a surface (such as the user's finger or the screen plate of a mariner's backstaff). The apertures are not viewing holes for sighting the Sun with the naked eye.

The second aperture also attenuates (darkens) the incoming sunlight by masking any annulus-shaped sunlight reflecting off the metal first aperture. This is similar to an iris in a camera lens reducing the light intensity.

Typically, the instrument is orientated such that the user faces looking slightly down upon the scale, with the Sun at the user's left and the right hand placed in such a way that a finger functions as a projection screen. When the apertures are optically aligned with the Sun, the user reads the angular measurement of the point where the graduated arc is bisected by the hanging plumb line.

A misconception by non-astronomers and non-navigators is that using the instrument requires two people: one to take the sight and one to read the plumb line's angular position. Actually, when measuring the Sun's altitude, the instrument is held flush (face on) and below eye level by a single user, meaning they can read the cord's angular position on the face of the instrument. However, it does help to have another person to write down the scale readings as they are taken; the device cannot be held sufficiently stable (retaining the optical alignment) with just one hand.

== Gallery ==
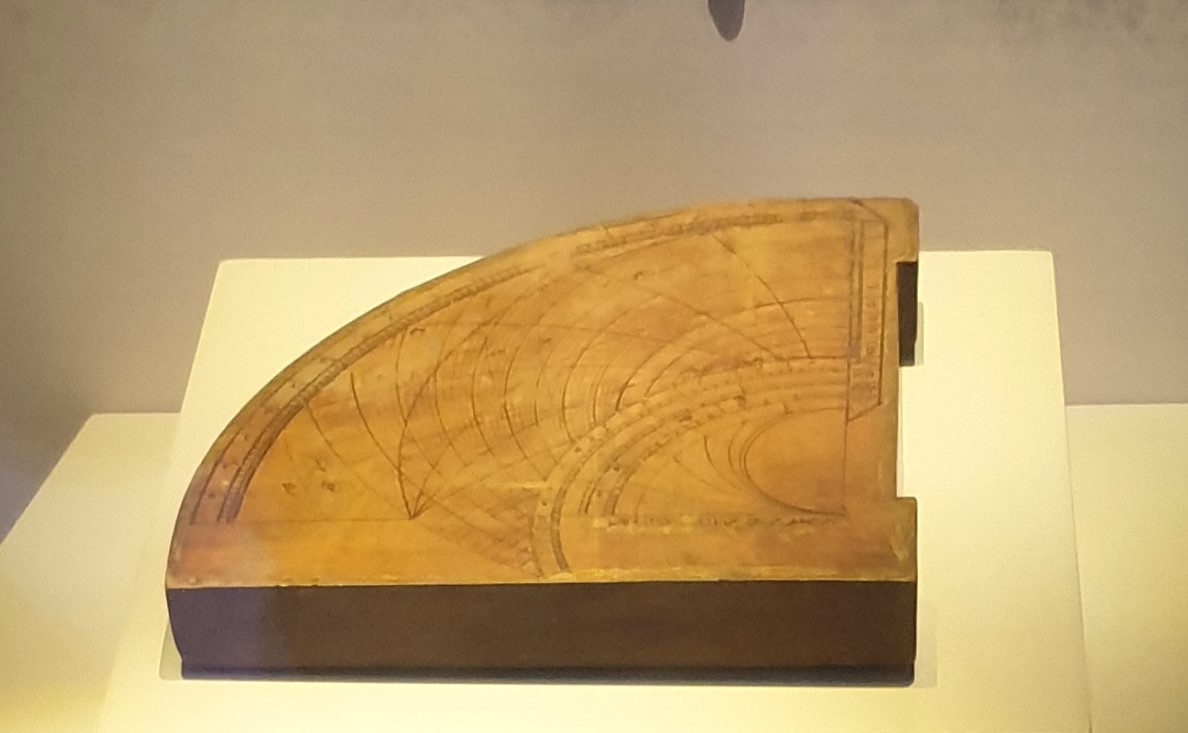
Ottoman sine quadrant

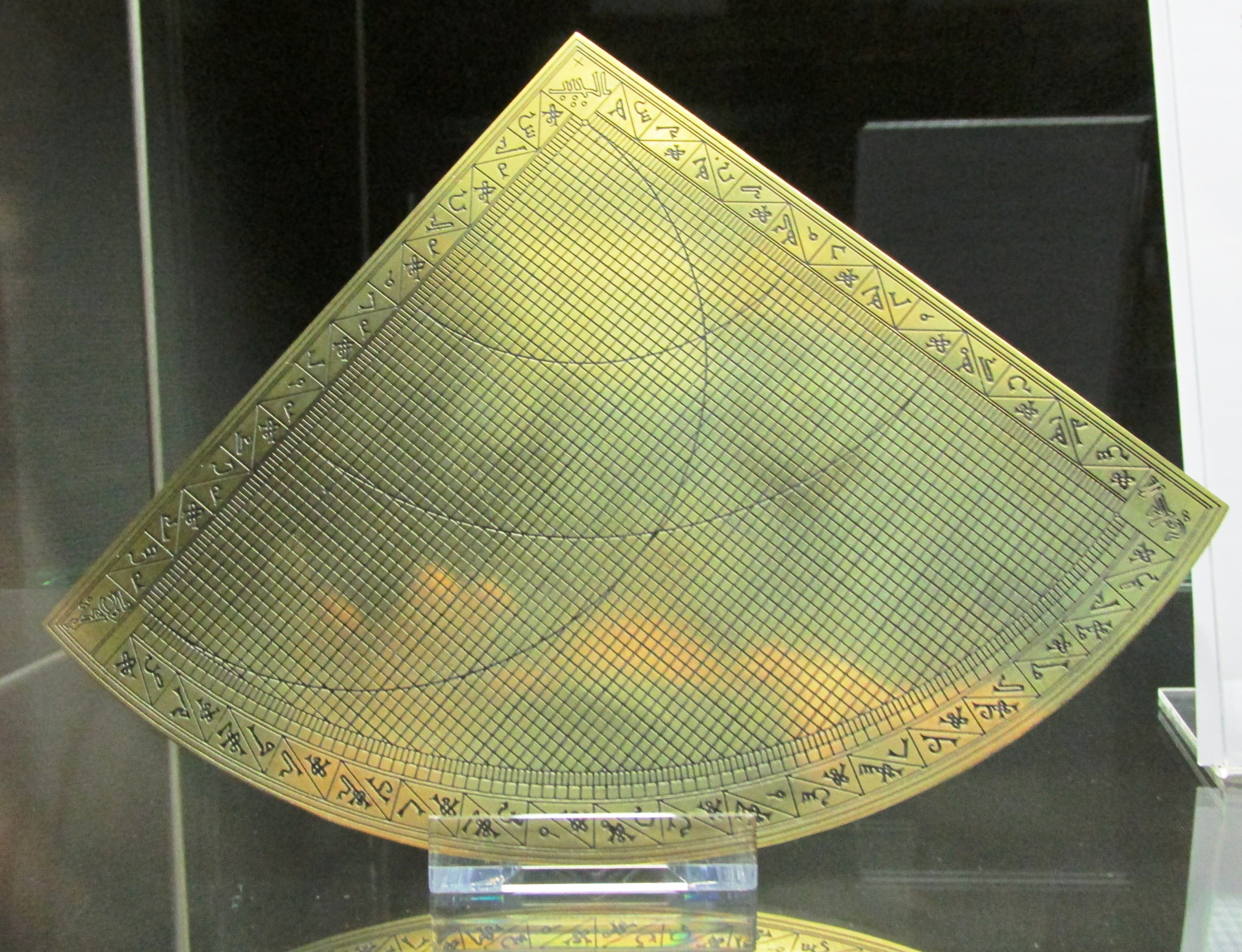
Sine quadrant

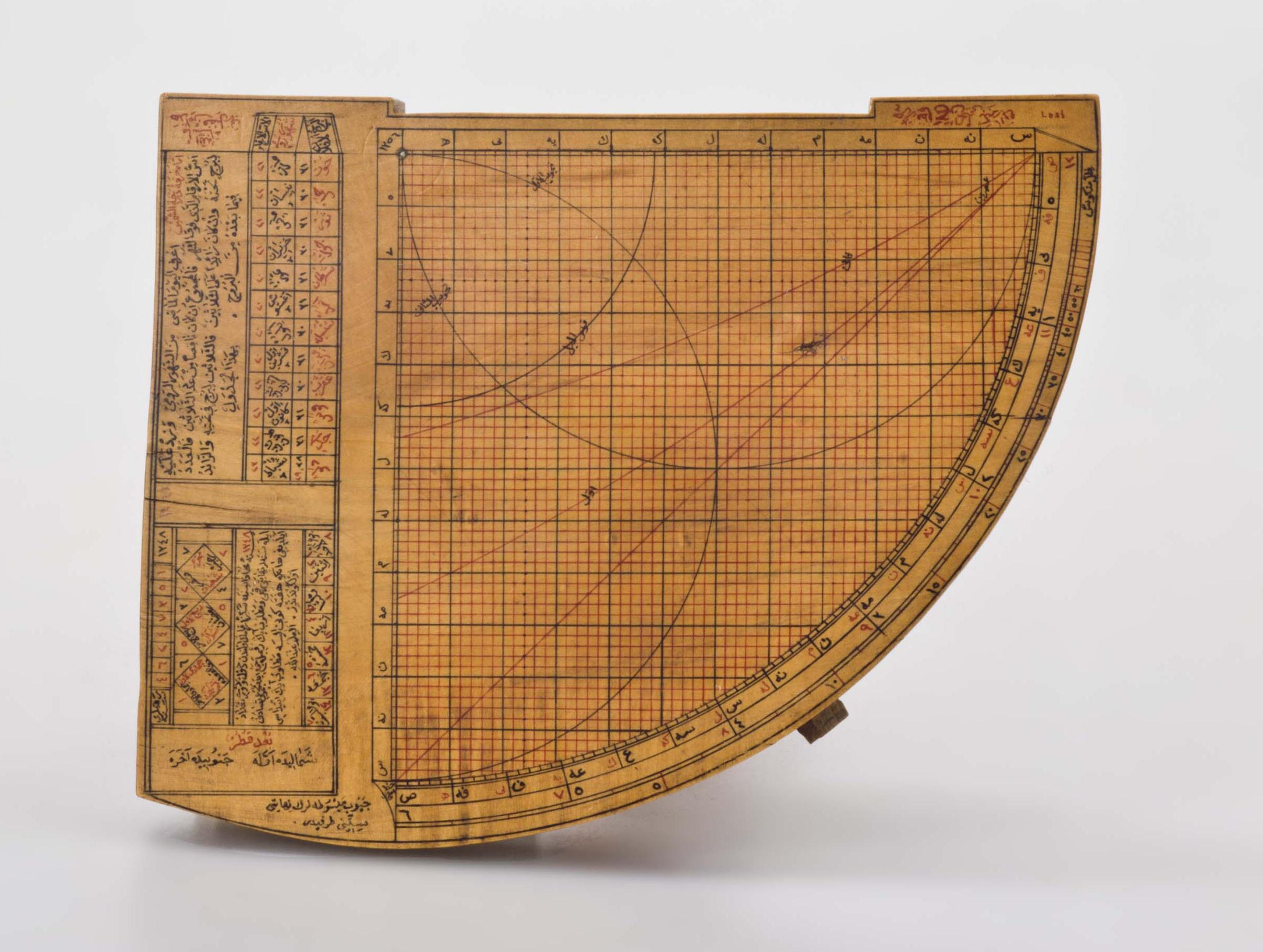
Wooden sine-cosine quadrant (1840)

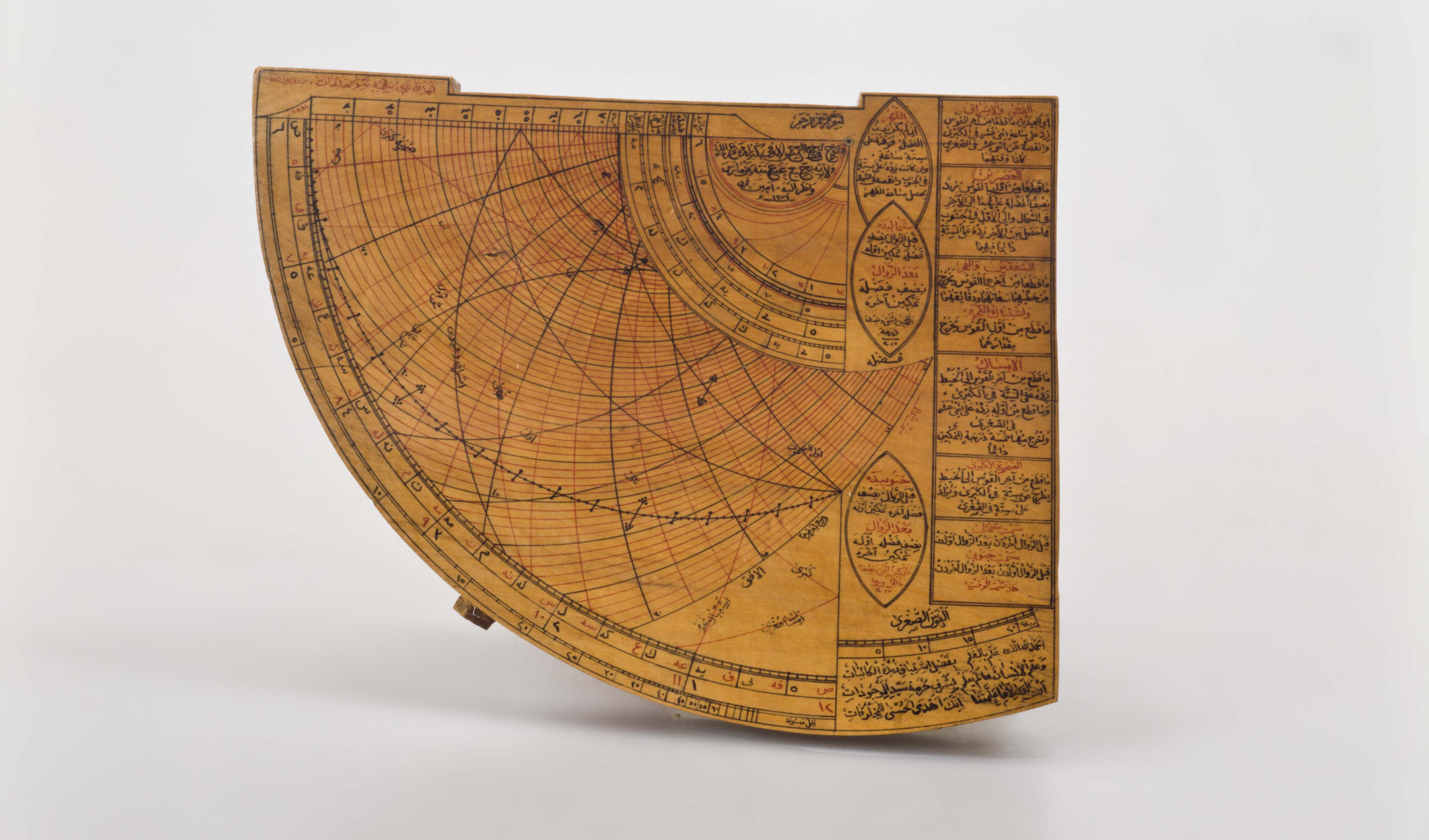
Reverse side of wooden quadrant, featuring an astrolabe quadrant
