= Sisson Rock =

Rock in Antarctica

- Location of Livingston Island in the South Shetland Islands

- Location within Antarctica Location within South Shetland Islands

Geography
- Location: Antarctica
- Coordinates: 62°33′57″S 61°08′52″W
- Archipelago: South Shetland Islands
- Area: 0.08 ha (0.20 acres)
- Length: 65 m (213 ft)
- Width: 37 m (121 ft)

Administration
- Administered under the Antarctic Treaty

Demographics
- Population: uninhabited

Topographic map of Livingston Island and Smith Island

Sisson Rock (Bulgarian: скала Сисън, romanized: skala Sisson, IPA: [skɐˈla ˈsisən]) is the rock off the north coast of Livingston Island in the South Shetland Islands, Antarctica 65 m (213 ft) long in west-east direction and 37 m (121 ft) wide, and split in three. Its surface area is 0.08 ha (0.20 acres). The vicinity was visited by early 19th-century sealers.

The feature is named after Jonathan Sisson (1690–1747), a British instrument maker who invented the modern theodolite for surveying; in association with other names in the area deriving from the early development or use of geodetic instruments and methods.

== Location ==
Sisson Rock is located at 62°33′57″S 61°08′52″W, which is 2.26 km northeast of Essex Point, 800 m west of Window Island and 1.5 km north of Voyteh Point, according to mapping in 2009 and 2017.

== See also ==
- List of Antarctic and subantarctic islands

== Maps ==
- Livingston Island to King George Island. Scale 1:200000. Admiralty Nautical Chart 1776. Taunton: UK Hydrographic Office, 1968
- South Shetland Islands. Scale 1:200000 topographic map No. 3373. DOS 610 - W 62 58. Tolworth, UK, 1968
- L. Ivanov. Antarctica: Livingston Island and Greenwich, Robert, Snow and Smith Islands. Scale 1:120000 topographic map. Troyan: Manfred Wörner Foundation, 2010. ISBN 978-954-92032-9-5 (First edition 2009. ISBN 978-954-92032-6-4)
- L. Ivanov. Antarctica: Livingston Island and Smith Island. Scale 1:100000 topographic map. Manfred Wörner Foundation, 2017. ISBN 978-619-90008-3-0
- Antarctic Digital Database (ADD). Scale 1:250000 topographic map of Antarctica. Scientific Committee on Antarctic Research (SCAR). Since 1993, regularly upgraded and updated
