= Sextant (astronomy) =

Measuring instrument in Astronomy

In astronomy, sextants are devices depicting a sixth of a circle, used primarily for measuring the position of stars. There are two types of astronomical sextants, mural instruments and frame-based instruments.

They are of significant historical importance, but have been replaced over time by transit telescopes, other astrometry techniques, and satellites such as Hipparcos.

== Mural sextants ==
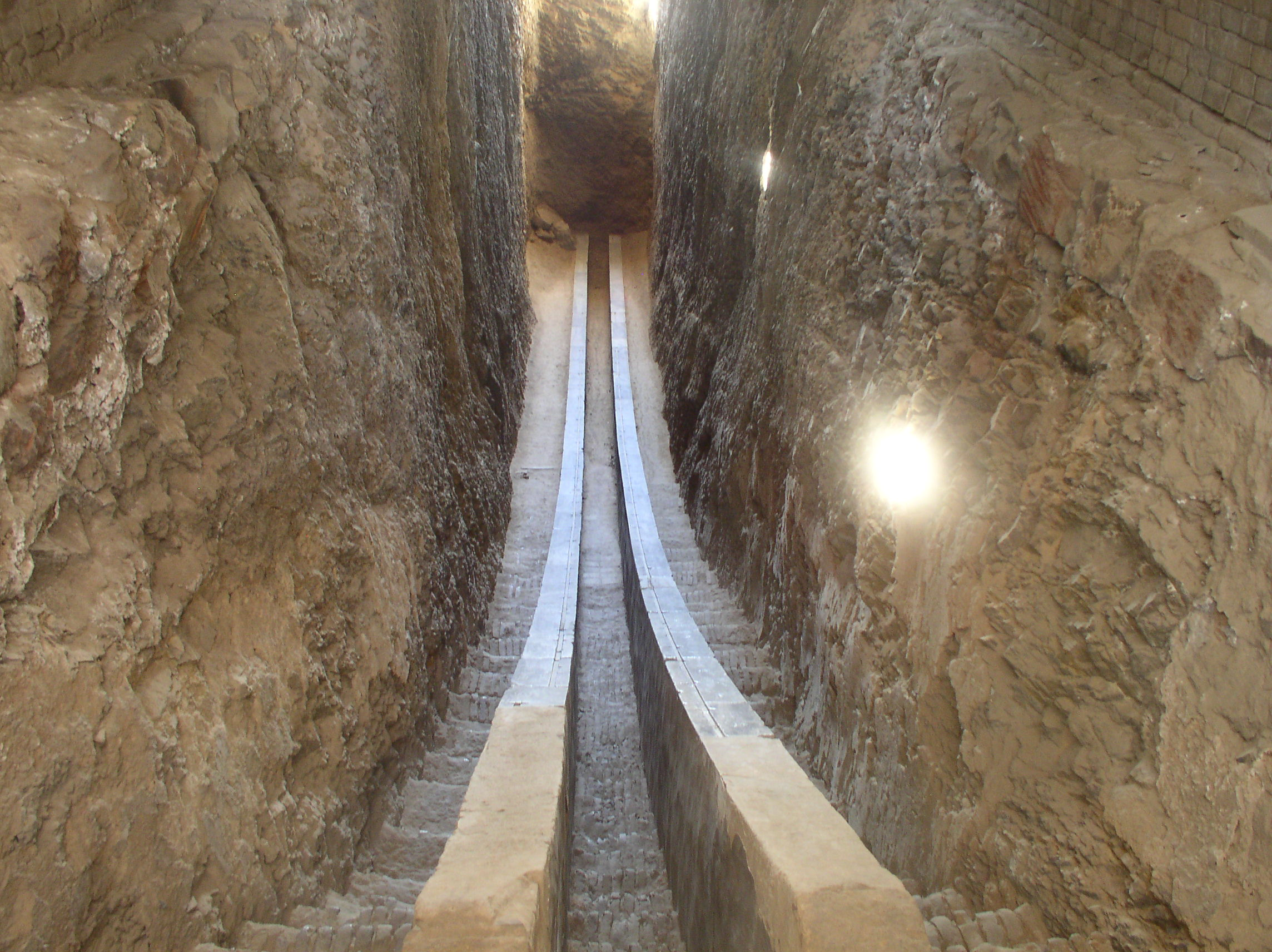
Remains of Ulugh Beg's mural sextant, Samarkand, Uzbekistan, 15th century.

The first known mural sextant was constructed in Ray, Iran, by Abu-Mahmud al-Khujandi in 994. To measure the obliquity of the ecliptic, al-Khujandī invented a device that he called al-Fakhri sextant (al-suds al Fakhrī), a reference to his patron, Buwayhid ruler, Fakhr al Dawla (976–997). This instrument was a sixty-degree arc on a wall aligned along a meridian (north–south) line. Al Khujandi's instrument was larger than previous instruments; it had a radius of about twenty meters. The main improvement incorporated in al-Fakhri sextants over earlier instruments was bringing the precision of reading to seconds while older instruments could only be read in degrees and minutes. This was confirmed by al-Birūni, al-Marrākushī and al-Kāshī. Al-Khujandī used his device to measure the sun's angle above the horizon at the summer and winter solstices; these two measurements allow computation of the latitude of the sextant's location and the obliquity of the ecliptic.

Ulugh Beg constructed a Fakhri Sextant that had a radius of 36 or 40.4 meters (depending on source), the largest instrument of its type in the 15th century. Housed in the Ulugh Beg Observatory, the sextant had a finely constructed arc with a staircase on either side to provide access for the assistants who performed the measurements.

== Framed sextants ==
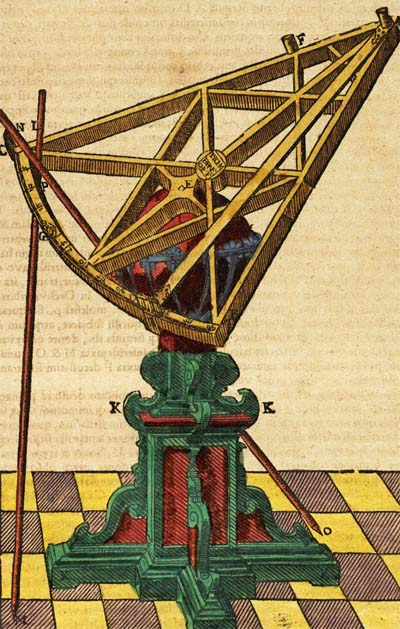
Tycho Brahe's sextant, used for measuring the angular distances between stars.

A sextant based on a large metal frame had an advantage over a mural instrument in that it could be used at any orientation. This allows the measure of angular distances between astronomical bodies.

These instruments differ substantially from a navigator's sextant in that the latter is a reflecting instrument. The navigator's sextant uses mirrors to bring the image of the sun, moon or a star to the horizon and measure the altitude of the object. Due to the use of the mirrors, the angle measured is twice the length of the instrument's arc. Hence, the navigator's sextant measures 120° on an arc with an included angle of 60°. By comparison, the astronomical sextants are large and measure angles directly — a 60° arc will measure at most 60°.

=== Construction ===
These large sextants are made primarily of wood, brass or a combination of both materials. The frame is heavy enough to be stiff and provide reliable measures without flexural changes in the instrument compromising the quality of the observation. The frame is mounted on a support structure that holds it in position while in use. In some cases, the position of the sextant can be adjusted to allow measurements to be made with any instrument orientation. Owing to the size and weight of the instrument, attention was paid to balancing it so that it could be moved with ease.

Observations were typically made with an alidade, though newer versions could use a telescope. In some cases, a system of counter-weights and pulleys were used to allow the observer to manipulate the instrument in spite of its size.

=== Usage ===
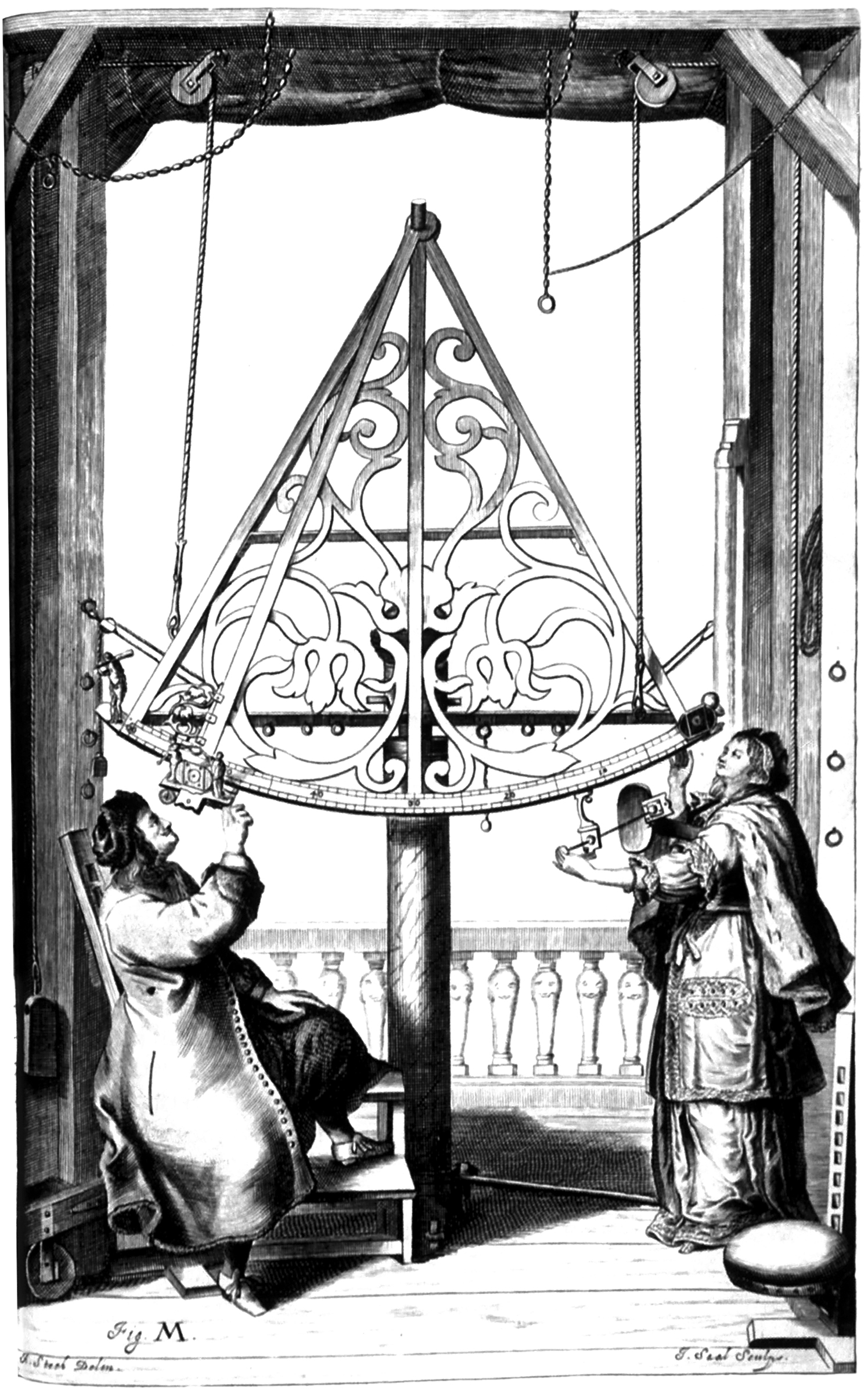
Johannes and Elisabetha Hevelius observing with the sextant.

These instruments were used in much the same way as smaller instruments, with effort possibly scaled due to the size. Some of the instruments might have needed more than one person to operate.

If the sextant is permanently fixed in position, only the position of the alidade or similar index need be determined. In that case, the observer moved the alidade until the object of interest is centered in the sights and then reads the graduations marked on the arc.

For instruments that could be moved, the process was more complex. It was necessary to sight the object with two lines. The edge of the instrument would typically be supplied with sights and the instrument was aligned with one of the two objects of interest. The alidade was then aligned with the second object as well. Once each object was centred in one set of sights, the reading could be taken. This could be a challenge for a moving star observed with a very large instrument as a single person might not be able to confirm both sights with ease; an assistant was a great benefit. The illustration of the Hevelius instrument to the right shows how two persons would use such a sextant: his wife Elisabetha is aligning the instrument while Johannes sets the alidade.

=== Well-known framed sextants ===
- Taqi al-Din used a sextant for the determination of the equinoxes.
- Tycho Brahe used a sextant for many of his stellar position measurements.
- Johannes Hevelius used a sextant with a particularly ingenious alidade to provide stellar position measurements of great accuracy.
- John Flamsteed, the first Astronomer Royal, used a sextant at the Royal Greenwich Observatory.

== See also ==
- List of astronomical instruments
