= Mural instrument =

Type of angle measuring device

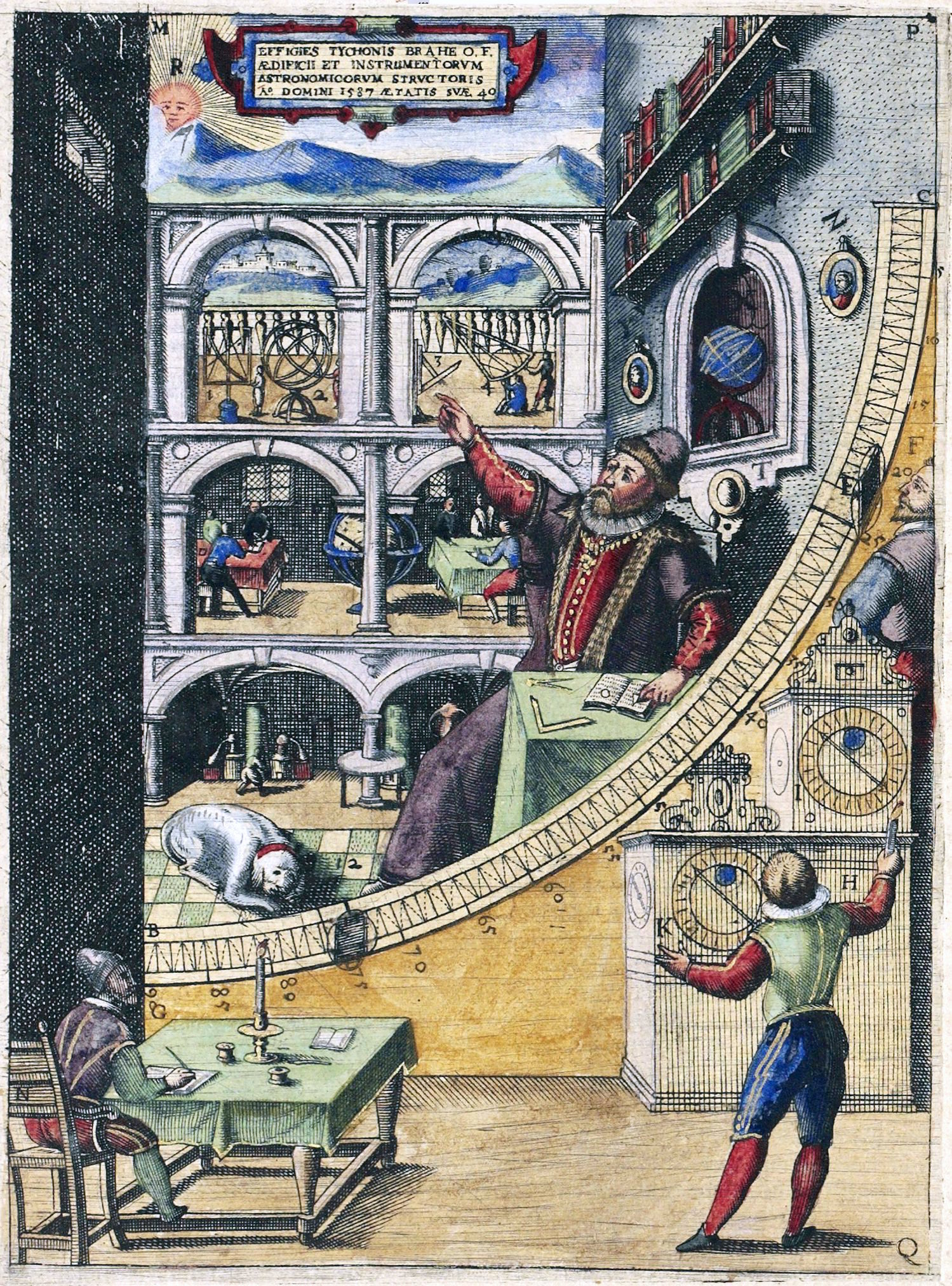
Tycho Brahe's mural quadrant

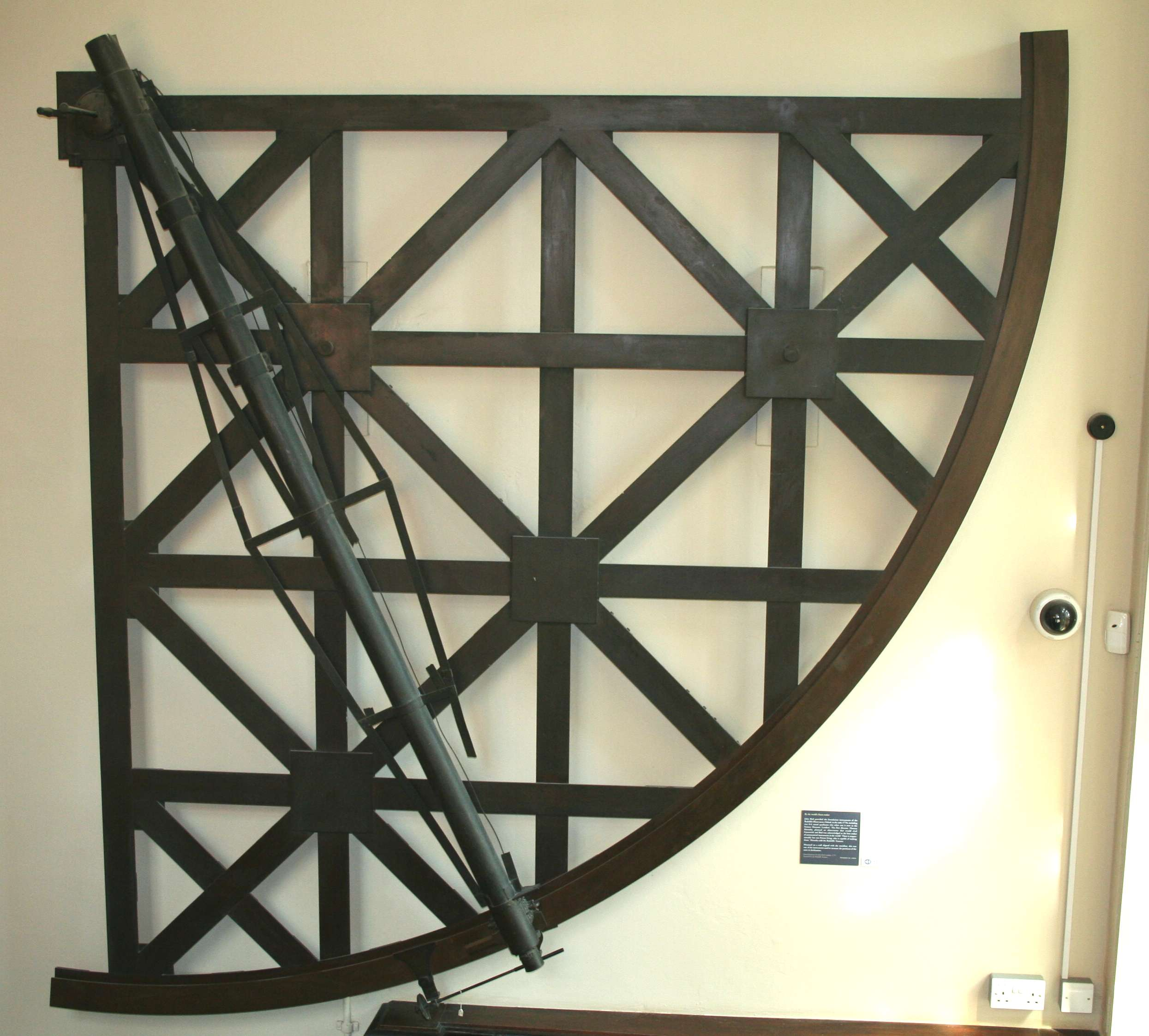
Mural quadrant constructed as a frame mounted on a wall. This instrument was made by John Bird in 1773 and is in the Museum of the History of Science, Oxford.

A mural instrument is an angle measuring instrument mounted on or built into a wall. For astronomical purposes, these walls were oriented so they lie precisely on the meridian. A mural instrument that measured angles from 0 to 90 degrees was called a mural quadrant. They were utilized as astronomical devices in ancient Egypt and ancient Greece. Edmond Halley, due to the lack of an assistant and only one vertical wire in his transit, confined himself to the use of a mural quadrant built by George Graham after its erection in 1725 at the Royal Observatory, Greenwich. Bradley's first observation with that quadrant was made on 15 June 1742.

The mural quadrant has been called the "quintessential instrument" of 18th century (i.e. 1700s) observatories. It rose to prominence in the field of positional astronomy at this time.

== Construction ==
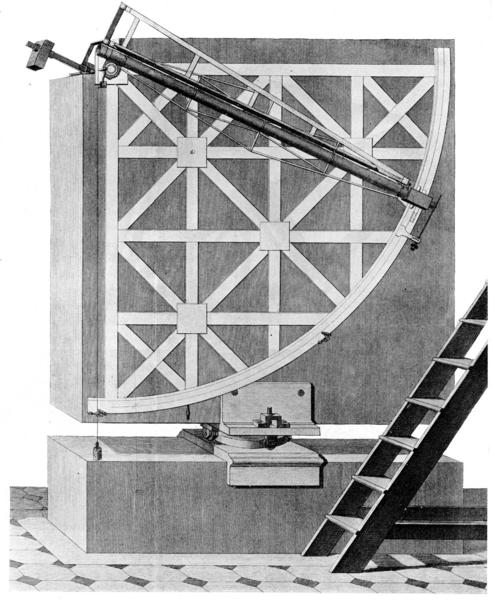
A Bird Mural Quadrant was for many years the main instrument of the Mannheim Observatory in Germany, shown here installed.

Many older mural quadrants have been constructed by marking directly on the wall surfaces. More recent instruments were made with a frame that was constructed with precision and mounted permanently on the wall.

The arc is marked with divisions, almost always in degrees and fractions of a degree. In the oldest instruments, an indicator is placed at the centre of the arc. An observer can move a device with a second indicator along the arc until the line of sight from the movable device's indicator through the indicator at the centre of the arc aligns with the astronomical object. The angle is then read, yielding the elevation or altitude of the object. In smaller instruments, an alidade could be used. More modern mural instruments would use a telescope with a reticle eyepiece to observe the object.

Many mural quadrants were constructed, giving the observer the ability to measure a 90° range of elevation. There were also mural sextants that read 60°.

Mural quadrants of the 17th century were noted for their expense, with Flamsteed's 1689 quadrant costing £120 (equivalent to £26,377 in 2025), and Edmund Halley's 1725 quadrant which cost over £200 (equivalent to £35,630 in 2025). The large fixed quadrants were more expensive than a typical portable quadrant, with a Bird 2-foot quadrant costing 70 guineas or £73.50 (equivalent to £13,094 in 2025).

== Usage ==
In order to measure the position of, for example, a star, the observer needs a sidereal clock in addition to the mural instrument. With the clock measuring time, a star of interest is observed with the instrument until it crosses an indicator showing that it is transiting the meridian. At this instant, the time on the clock is recorded as well as the angular elevation of the star. This yields the position in the coordinates of the instrument. If the instrument's arc is not marked relative to the celestial equator, then the elevation is corrected for the difference, resulting in the star's declination. If the sidereal clock is precisely synchronized with the stars, the time yields the right ascension directly.

== Famous mural instruments ==
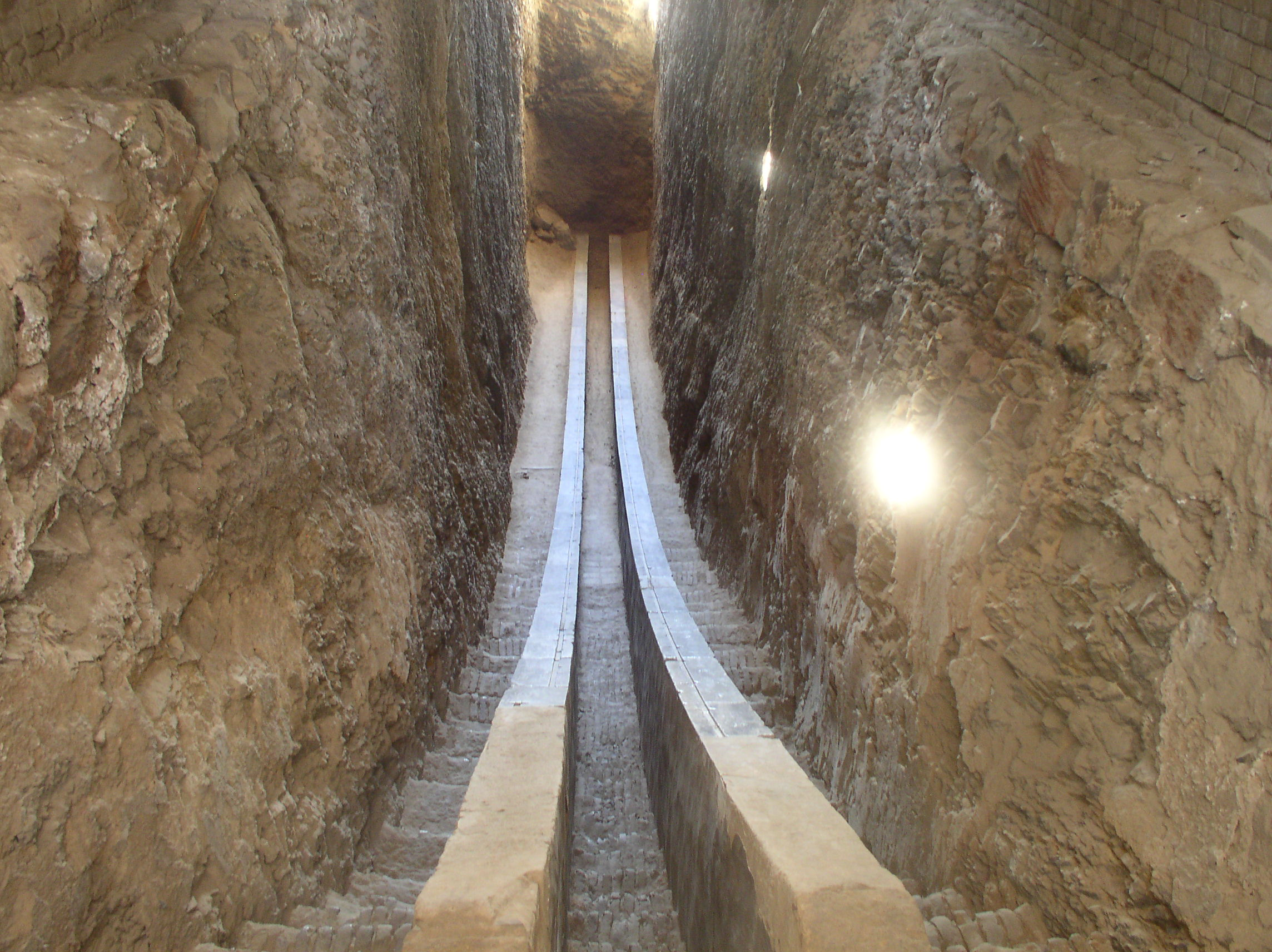
Ulugh Beg's mural sextant, constructed in Samarkand, Uzbekistan, during the 15th century

- A mural sextant was constructed in Ray, Iran, by Abu-Mahmud al-Khujandi in 994.
- Ulugh Beg constructed the "Fakhri Sextant" in Samarkand that had a radius of 40 meters. Seen in the image on the right, the arc was finely constructed with a staircase on either side to provide access for the assistants who performed the measurements.
- Tycho Brahe's mural quadrant in Uraniborg at Hven (now Ven in Sweden).
- The mural quadrant at the Royal Observatory, Greenwich, in east London.
- Ptolemy's mural quadrant at Alexandria. This instrument is also referred to as a plinth.
- The obsolete constellation Quadrans Muralis represents a mural quadrant.
- The mural quadrant at the Mannheim Observatory in Germany. This is another of John Bird's instruments.

== See also ==
- List of astronomical instruments
