= Mustafa ibn Ali al-Muwaqqit =

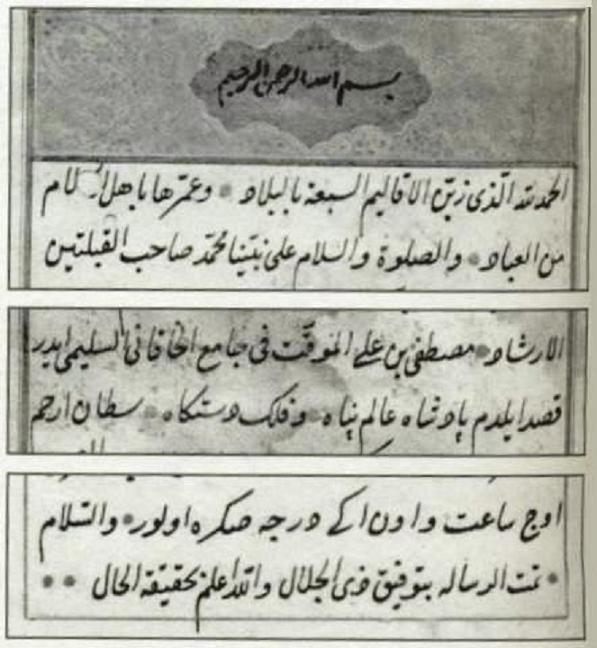
- A page of I'lam al-'ibad fi a'lam al-bilad by Mustafa ibn Ali
- Born: early 16th century Constantinople, Ottoman Empire
- Died: 1571; Istanbul, Ottoman Empire
- Other names: Müneccimbaşı Mustafa Çelebi, Koca Saatçi
- Scientific career
- Fields: Astronomy; Geography; Mathematics; Timekeeping
- Workplaces: Mosque of Selim I

Müneccimbaşı of the Ottoman Empire
- In office c. 1560–1571
- Monarchs: Suleiman, Selim II
- Preceded by: Yusuf ibn Umar
- Succeeded by: Taqi ad-Din Muhammad ibn Ma'ruf

Mustafa ibn Ali al-Muwaqqit (died 1571, the epithet al-Muwaqqit means "the timekeeper"), also known as Müneccimbaşı Mustafa Çelebi and Koca Saatçi, was an Ottoman astronomer and author of geography from the sixteenth century. Because of his works on the science of timekeeping and practical astronomy, he is considered "the founder of the Ottoman tradition" of those fields. He was one of the pioneers of astronomy literature in Ottoman Turkish—instead of Arabic which was more common in the Islamic world—following Muhammad al-Qunawi. Since his youth he served as the muwaqqit (religious timekeeper) attached to the Mosque of Selim I in Istanbul, in which capacity he produced most of his writing. In 1560 or later he was appointed to the office of müneccimbaşı, the highest post for astronomers of the Empire.

== Early life ==
Muslih al-Din Mustafa ibn Ali al-Qustantini al-Rumi was born in Istanbul, the capital of the Ottoman Empire, in the early sixteenth century. Among his teachers were the astronomer Mirim Çelebi (1475–1525), as well Muhammad al-Qunawi (d. c. 1524) a muwaqqit (religious timekeeper) in the tradition of Shams al-Din al-Khalili and Ibn al-Shatir, and Ottoman astronomer who began the attempt to write about his field in Ottoman Turkish rather than Arabic.

== Career ==
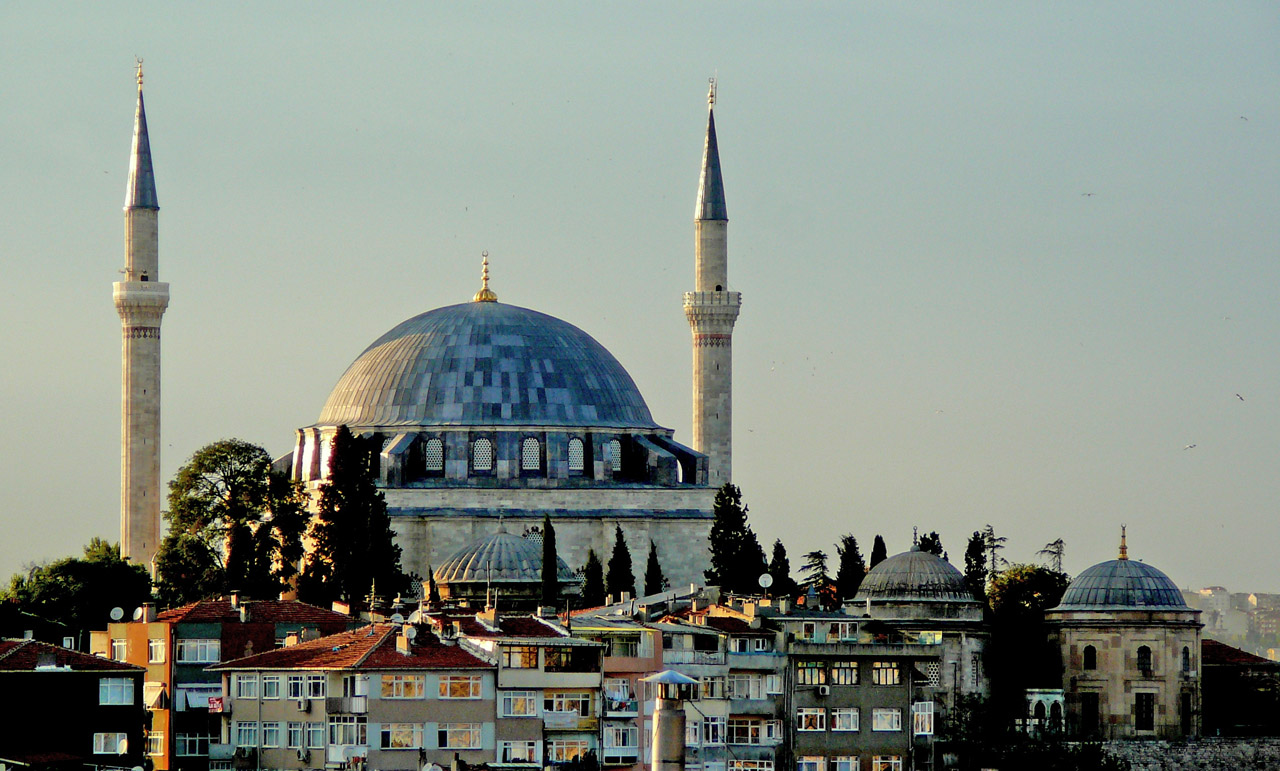
Mosque of Selim I, where Mustafa served as muwaqqit from a young age.

Mustafa ibn Ali was appointed as the muwaqqit of the Mosque of Selim I in Istanbul, when he was young. He produced most of his works during this tenure. Instead of Arabic, the customary scientific language of the Islamic World at the time, he wrote mostly in Ottoman Turkish. This decision was made in order to popularise the field of astronomy in the Ottoman state, to make it accessible to more students, and to facilitate the mention of non-Arabic place names. Many of his works were dedicated for Sultan Suleiman the Magnificent and his grand viziers, possibly aimed to be used by the state bureaucracy; this application was facilitated by the use of Turkish. According to the historian of science İhsan Fazlıoğlu, the relatively high number of extant copies of his works was an indication of the success of his attempt to reach a wider audience by using Turkish. His works were reproduced up to the middle of the nineteenth century and were used as textbooks in madrasa and muvakkithanes (offices of the muwaqqits). Fazlıoğlu characterised his works by their "high level of geometry, trigonometry (especially spherical trigonometry), and numerical analysis", and their style of writing that is easy to understand and apply.

Among his earliest works was a book of mathematical geography titled I'lam al-'ibad fi a'lam al-bilad ("Notices on the Distances of Cities of the World"), written in Ottoman Turkish. It includes a list of 100 major cities from Morocco to China, and the coordinates, distance from Istanbul, the qibla (direction that indicates Mecca) of each city. It was written in 1525 and was dedicated to Suleiman the Magnificent. His subsequent work on geography, Tuhfat az-zaman wa-kharidat al-awan (also in Ottoman Turkish), discusses the discipline of geography and its roots, the celestial objects, the Earth, its geographical features, and its division into seven climes. It was built on works by earlier scholars, including astronomers Jaghmini, Qadizade al-Rumi, and Zakariya al-Qazwini, as well as the zoologist Al-Damiri.

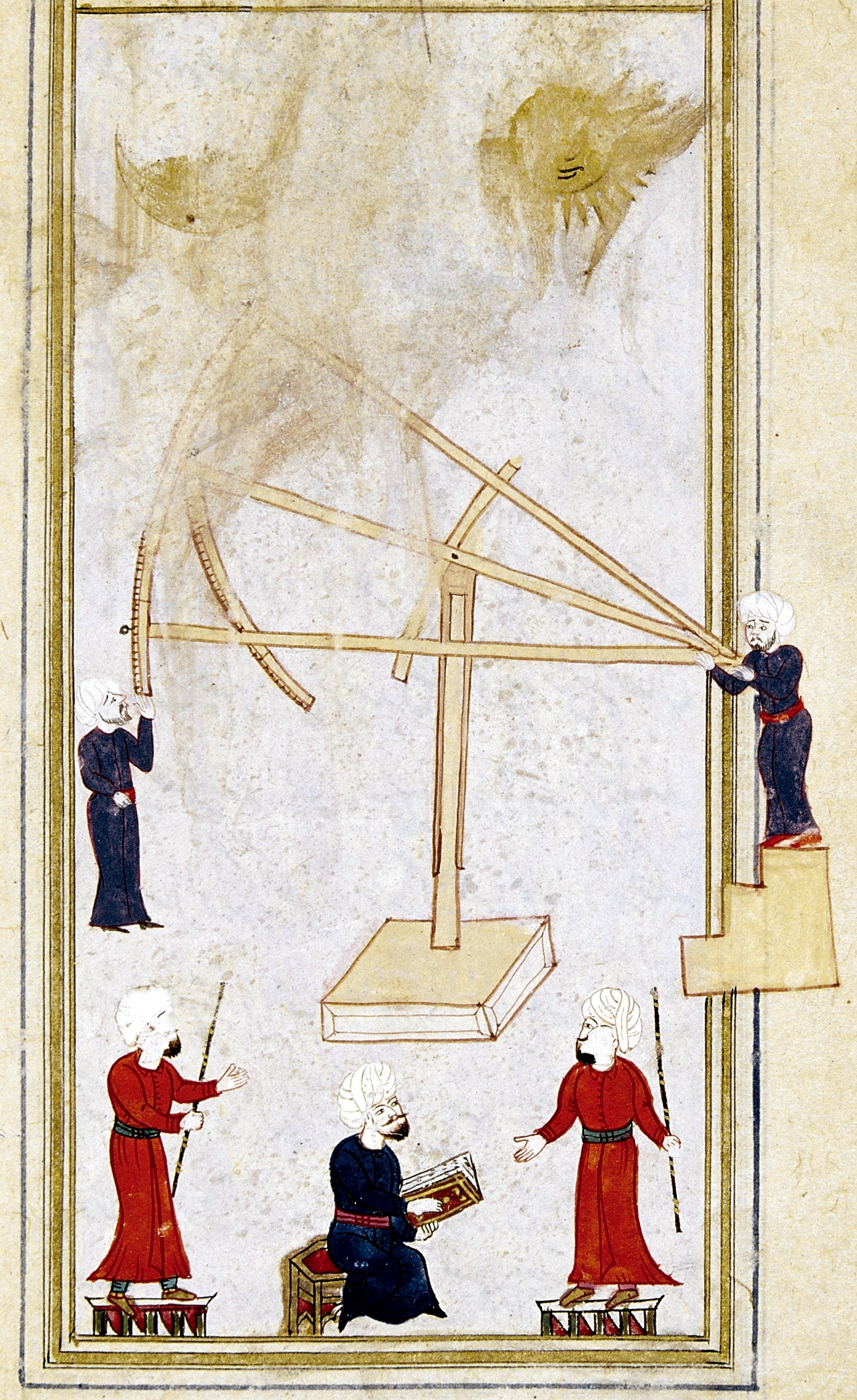
Ottoman astronomers of the sixteenth century

Many of his other works were about astronomical instruments. Among these, Faraḥ Fazā was dedicated to the grand vizier Pargalı Ibrahim Pasha and describes the horizontal quadrant (al-rub' al-afaqi), which according to Mustafa was his own invention. Another work, Kifayat al-qanu' fi al-'amal bi'r-rub' al-maqtu was written in Arabic and was a commentary on the works of an earlier muwaqqit Sibt al-Maridini. His other works, Kifayat al-waqt, also known as Risala fi al-muqantarat (1529), was written in Turkish and describes an instrument called the astrolabic quadrant, as well as other themes in geometry, trigonometry, and astronomy. Today 120 copies of this work are extant in various libraries. His Tashil al-miqat (1529) discusses the science of timekeeping and the sine quadrant (al-rub' al-mujayyab). This work appeared to have been continuously updated, and today it is found in 100 extant copies of five distinct versions. He describes another instrument, al-mujayyab al-afaqi in the work Risalah-i jayb-i afaqi (1529, Turkish) and describes its use for the coordinates of Istanbul in the work Hall da'irat mu'addil al-nahar (1531, Turkish) which was commissioned by the grand vizier Ayas Mehmed Pasha. His longest work was Risalat al-asturlab al-Selimi ("Selim's Treatise on the Astrolabe"), which was written in 1544, also in Turkish, and discusses the construction of the astrolabe, its mathematical properties, and its uses, based on Zij-i Sultani published by the astronomer Ulugh Beg in 1438 or 1439.

In or after 1560, he was appointed müneccimbaşı (or munajjim-bashi, "head astrologer"), the highest office for astronomers in the Ottoman Empire, hence his other name "Müneccimbaşı Mustafa Çelebi". He replaced Yusuf ibn Umar and held the post until his death in 1571. He was the primary reference in the Ottoman Empire on the science of timekeeping, and according to the Turkish explorer Evliya Çelebi his works were cited in Western Europe. Other than the title al-muwaqqit and müneccimbaşı, based on his offices, he was also known by the honorific Koca Saatçi ("the great timekeeper"). After Mustafa's death, Sultan Selim II appointed the prominent scholar Taqi ad-Din Muhammad ibn Ma'ruf—who just returned to Istanbul in 1570 after his service in the Egypt Eyalet—as his successor.

== Legacy ==
Mustafa ibn Ali was one of the most important Ottoman astronomers of the sixteenth century. Because of his works on the theory and applications of the science of timekeeping and practical astronomy, Fazlıoğlu writes that he is considered to be "the founder of the Ottoman tradition" of those fields. He was one of the earliest authors of astronomy in Turkish, a tradition started by Muhammad al-Qunawi.

== Bibliography ==
- Aydüz, Salim (2017). "Ottoman time keeping houses: Muwaqqitkhānas". Études balkaniques. 2: 214–229.
- Blake, Stephen P. (2016). Astronomy and Astrology in the Islamic World. Edinburgh University Press. ISBN 978-0-7486-4911-2.
- Fazlıoğlu, İhsan (2007). "ʿAlī al‐Muwaqqit: Muṣliḥ al‐Dīn Muṣṭafā ibn ʿAlī al‐Qusṭanṭīnī al‐Rūmī al‐Ḥanafī al‐Muwaqqit". In Thomas Hockey; Virginia Trimble; Thomas R. Williams; Katherine Bracher; Richard A. Jarrell; Jordan D. MarchéII; JoAnn Palmeri; Daniel W. E. Green (eds.). The Biographical Encyclopedia of Astronomers. New York: Springer. pp. 33–34. ISBN 9780387310220.
