= Muhammad al-Qunawi =

Ottoman astronomer and timekeeper

Muhammad al-Qunawi al-Muwaqqit
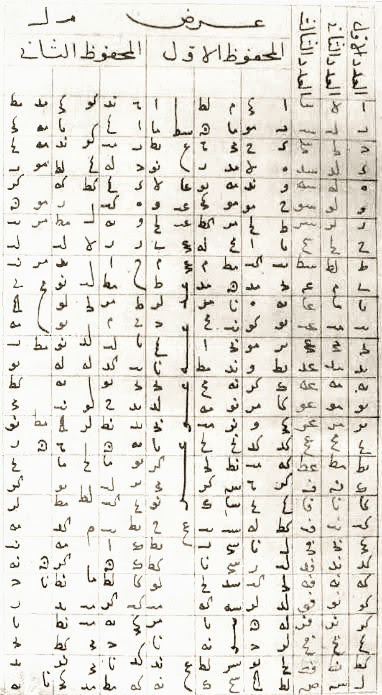
- Muhammad al-Qunawi edition of al-Khalili's universal table
- Born: 15th century
- Died: c. 1524; Constantinople, Ottoman Empire
- Other name: Muhammad ibn al-Katib Sinan
- Scientific career
- Fields: Astronomy; Timekeeping
- Workplaces: New Mosque of Edirne; Sublime Porte

Muhammad ibn al-Katib Sinan al-Qunawi (died c. 1524), also known as Muhammad ibn Yusuf, was an Ottoman astronomer and muwaqqit (timekeeper) in the late fifteenth and early sixteenth century. A pioneer of Ottoman astronomy, especially in the field of astronomical instruments and timekeeping, he served as muwaqqit at various mosques, and eventually at the Sublime Porte under Suleiman the Magnificent (r. 1520–1566). He was influenced by earlier Mamluk astronomers, especially Shams al-Din al-Khalili (1320–1380) and Ibn al-Shatir (c. 1304–1375), as well as by the Central Asian Ali al-Qushji and Al-Biruni.

He wrote two treatises on the construction of the astrolabe quadrant (al-rub' al-muqantarat), including Hadiyat al-Muluk ("A Present for Kings") dedicated to Bayezid II (r. 1481–1512). He published a Turkish edition of Al-Khalili's universal tables, and compiled Mizan al-Kawakib ("Balance of the Stars"), containing tables that allow reading the time at night by observing the stars—"the most original Ottoman contribution to astronomical timekeeping by tables" according to historian of astronomy David A. King. In addition to the then commonly used Arabic, he also wrote in Turkish, in order to make his field more accessible throughout the empire. This tradition would be continued by astronomers such as Mustafa ibn Ali al-Muwaqqit. Taha Yasin Arslan writes that al-Qunawi "single-handedly pioneered" the science of timekeeping in the Ottoman Empire.

== Origin ==
A modern map of Turkey, depicting Istanbul and Edirne where Al-Qunawi worked, and Konya, his family's origin implied by his nisba al-Qunawi.

Little biographical information is known about Muhammad al-Qunawi. His nisba, al-Qunawi, indicates that he or his family came from Konya (Qunya), but historian of science İhsan Fazlıoğlu writes that he was likely born in Istanbul, the capital of the Ottoman Empire. His father Sinan worked as a scribe (katib) in the imperial chancery, hence his patronym, Ibn (son of) al-Katib Sinan. He was also known as Muhammad ibn Yusuf.

== Life ==
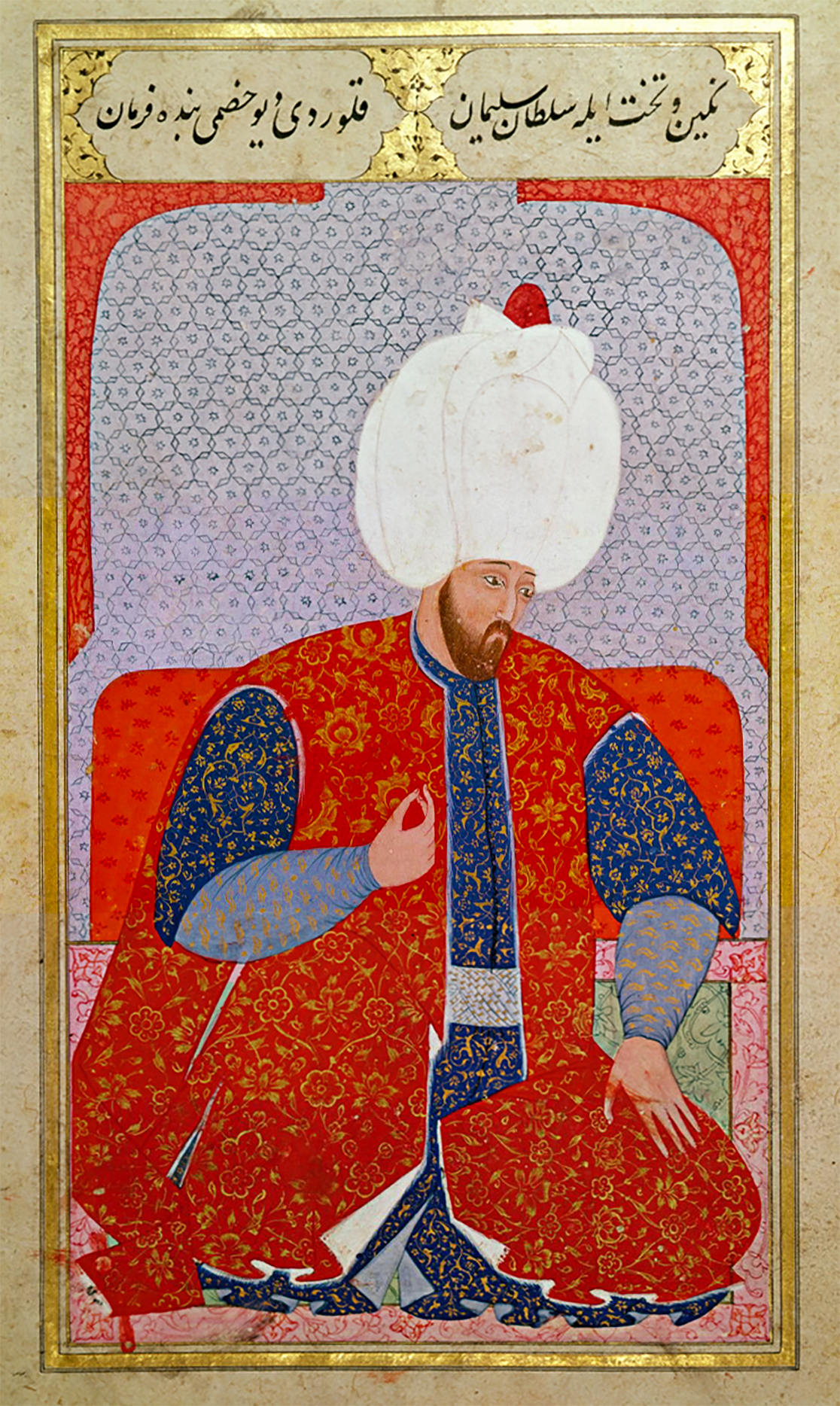
Al-Qunawi served as the muwaqqit of the imperial court of Suleiman the Magnificent (pictured).

According to his Kitāb al‐aṣl al‐muʿaddil, al-Qunawi "had met all the important astronomers of the time", referring to the Ottoman astronomers in his social and intellectual circles. These astronomers learned the works of the Samarkand astronomer Ali al-Qushji (died 1474), who continued the works of Mamluk-era astronomers Shams al-Din al-Khalili (1320–1380) and Ibn al-Shatir (c. 1304–1375), two of the leaders of the science of timekeeping (ilm al-miqat) in the Islamic world.

After his studies, he served as muwaqqit (mosque timekeepers) in various mosques in Istanbul and Edirne, including the New Mosque (Yeni Camii) of Edirne. Based on remarks in Tarjamah‐i jadawil‐i afaqi, Fazlıoğlu infers that as muwaqqit he likely taught astronomy in the muwaqqit's institutions (muvakkithanes) of these mosques, and that Turkish was the language of instruction used. Al-Qunawi specialised in the science of timekeeping and in astronomical instruments. In his Mizan al-Kawakib ("Balance of the Stars") written during the reign of Suleiman the Magnificent (r. 1520–1566), he signed himself as the muwaqqit of the Ottoman court, also known as the Sublime Porte. Al-Qunawi's works have been attested in the late fifteenth and early sixteenth century—during the reigns of Bayezid II (r. 1481–1512), for whom he dedicated Hadiyyat al-muluk ("A Present to Kings") and Tarjamah‐i jadawil‐i afaqi; Selim I (r. 1512–1520), in whose name he wrote Fadl al-da'ir; and Suleiman, for whom he presented Mizan al-Kawakib. Al-Qunawi died c. 1524 in Istanbul.

== Works ==
Most or all of Al-Qunawi's works are about timekeeping or astronomical instruments. According to historian of science Taha Yasin Arslan, there are thirteen known works, including nine in "very plain" Ottoman Turkish, while Fazlıoğlu writes that there are eleven works: seven in Arabic and the rest in Turkish. Arslan writes that Al-Qunawi "single-handedly pioneered Ottoman timekeeping", following the legacy of the Mamluk astronomers. Whenever possible, Al-Qunawi reused information produced by his Mamluk predecessors, and focused on subjects or aspects which were still not covered by them. He also preferred to treat areas that were of practical value in religious, administrative, or social fields. For example, many aspects of Islamic religion and culture demand calculations which astronomy can facilitate, such as the determination of the Islamic lunar calendar. Furthermore, the timetable of the daily prayers (salat) and the direction to Mecca (qibla) requires specific calculations for each locality, and Al-Qunawi calculated those for Istanbul.

=== On the construction of the quadrant ===
Al-Qunawi's Hadiyat al-Muluk ("A Present for Kings", undated, but which was completed during the reign of Bayezid II, ending in 1512) deals with a type of quadrant called the rub' al-muqantarat in Arabic (or rubu tahtası in Ottoman Turkish, translated into English as the "almucantar quadrant" or the "astrolabe quadrant"). In the early Ottoman astronomy, this instrument was usually made in pairs with another type, the rub' al-mujayyab ("the sine quadrant"), forming the two sides of a set called the rub' al-da'ira). The rub' al-muqantarat contained marking (such as curves and scales) similar to those found in an astrolabe, and although less precise, it was simpler to use.

Hadiyat al-Muluk's twenty chapters begin with Al-Qunawi's methods to construct the frame of the rub' al-muqantarat and to verify its accuracy. Al-Qunawi then explains how to make its various markings, including the ratio scale, as well as its arcs. It includes curves relevant for calculating prayer times, arcs representing the zodiac signs, and the construction of the azimuths. The markings involve calculations with parameters that depend on the local latitude, and one of Al-Qunawi's intentions was to make it easy for Ottoman astronomers and muwaqqits to build a new instrument when they moved into a new latitude. The book is characterised by its use of plain language, concrete examples, and simple mathematical equations aimed at people with only basic knowledge in astronomy and mathematics. In his preface Al-Qunawi states that by writing the book he hopes to gain an audience with Bayezid II, for whom the book was dedicated.

Hadiyat al-Muluk was widely circulated and left a lasting legacy: twenty-five copies are extant, most of them dated from the seventeenth century or later, and copies were still being made in the nineteenth century. Al-Qunawi also wrote Risala fi ma'rifat wad' al-dairat al-rub' mawdu 'ala 'al-muqantarat, a treatise about the same device. The two works are the earliest known writings in Turkish on the construction of astronomical instruments.

=== Al-Khalili's tables ===
Al-Qunawi wrote a new version of Shams al-Din al-Khalili's "universal auxiliaries tables"—containing solutions to all standard problems of spherical astronomy for each degree of latitude—which he titled Tarjamah‐i jadāwil‐i āfāqi. He translated the introduction to Turkish, copied Al-Khalili's entire tables, and added an extra one for the fractional latitude of 40°30′N. He added his own preface, in which he remarked about his motivation in writing it: "some of our sons wanted, from this poor man, to learn about sine tables; and so we translated this work into Turkish". Extant copies of this work are in the Hagia Sophia library in Istanbul and in the Topkapı Palace library.

=== On timekeeping by the stars ===
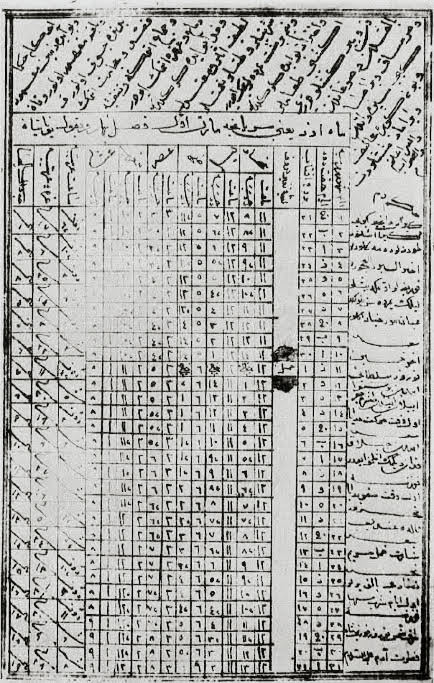
A page from Al-Qunawi's table for timekeeping by the stars

Al-Qunawi's Mizan al-Kawakib ("Balance of the Stars"), written in Arabic, provides tables for determining the time by looking at the stars. It consists of more than 500 pages totalling about 250,000 entries, computed for the latitude of Istanbul (41°). Pages in the main set of tables (illustrated) display each degree of the solar longitude as its rows, and each degree of right ascensions of culminating stars as its columns. To read the time, one observes the star that is culminating at the instant, then looks up its right ascension using an additional table, also provided. One then uses the aforementioned right ascension, as well as the current solar longitude, to find the appropriate row and column in the main tables. The intersection of the said row and column presents the time, stated in four values: duration after sunset, duration before sunrise, duration before dawn, and duration before midday. This method allows for reading the time at night, and according to historian of science David A. King it represents "the most original Ottoman contribution to astronomical timekeeping by tables." Surviving copies are found in Istanbul's Hagia Sophia and Topkapı Palace libraries.

=== Other works ===
Al-Qunawi wrote Hadiyyat al-ikhwan ("A Present for the Brothers"), in Turkish, with the word brothers in the title referring to his fellow muwaqqits. He developed a simplified standard usage of various quadrants, and in his al-Asl al-muaddil he wrote about a new astronomical calculation method.

== Legacy ==
The works of Al-Qunawi carried the legacy of Mamluk astronomers such as Shams al-Din Al-Khalili and Ibn al-Shatir and combined it with influence from other astronomers, including Al-Biruni and Ali al-Qushji, both of Central Asia. His decision to write some of his works in Turkish helped the field to become more accessible in the Ottoman Empire and started a new "turkification" trend in the Ottoman astronomical literature, which would be followed by other astronomers, including the later court chief astronomer Mustafa ibn Ali al-Muwaqqit (d. 1571).

== Bibliography ==
- Arslan, Taha Yasin (2016). "Conquering the Time: An Example of a Manual for Making an Astrolabe Quadrant: Muhammad Qunawī's Hadiyyat al-Mulūk". Nazariyat. 2 (4). doi:10.12658/Nazariyat.2.4.M0026. Also available in Turkish: Vakti Fethetmek: Mîkât İlmi Geleneğinde Rub‘u’l-mukantarât Yapım Kılavuzu Örneği Olarak Muhammed Konevî’nin Hediyyetü’l-mülûk’u.
- Fazlıoğlu, İhsan (2007). "Qunawī: Muḥammad ibn al-Kātib Sīnān al-Qunawī". In Thomas Hockey; Virginia Trimble; Thomas R. Williams; Katherine Bracher; Richard A. Jarrell; Jordan D. MarchéII; JoAnn Palmeri; Daniel W. E. Green (eds.). The Biographical Encyclopedia of Astronomers. New York: Springer. pp. 945–946.
- King, David A. (1977). M. Dizer (ed.). Astronomical Timekeeping in Ottoman Turkey. International Symposium On the Observatories in Islam. pp. 244–272.
- King, David A. (2004). In Synchrony With The Heavens: Studies In Astronomical Timekeeping And Instrumentation In Medieval Islamic Civilization. Vol. 1: The Call of the Muezzin (studies I-IX). Leiden and Boston: Brill. ISBN 978-90-04-12233-8.
