= Abd Allah ibn Muhammad al-Shafi'i al-Nabarawi =

Egyptian Shāfiʿī scholar and writer

ʿAbd Allāh ibn Muḥammad al-Shāfiʿī al-Nabarāwī or al-Nabrāwī (c. 1790 – 1859) was an Egyptian Shāfiʿī scholar and writer. He wrote treatises on Arabic and bayān (clarity), commentaries on works of fiqh by Ibn Hishām, al-Khaṭīb al-Shirbīnī, al-Suyūṭī, al-Sibṭ al-Mārdīnī and Ibn ʿAqīl, and a commentary on al-Nawawī's work on ḥadīth.
