= Taqi ad-Din Muhammad ibn Ma'ruf =

Ottoman polymath (1526–1585)

Taqi al-Din
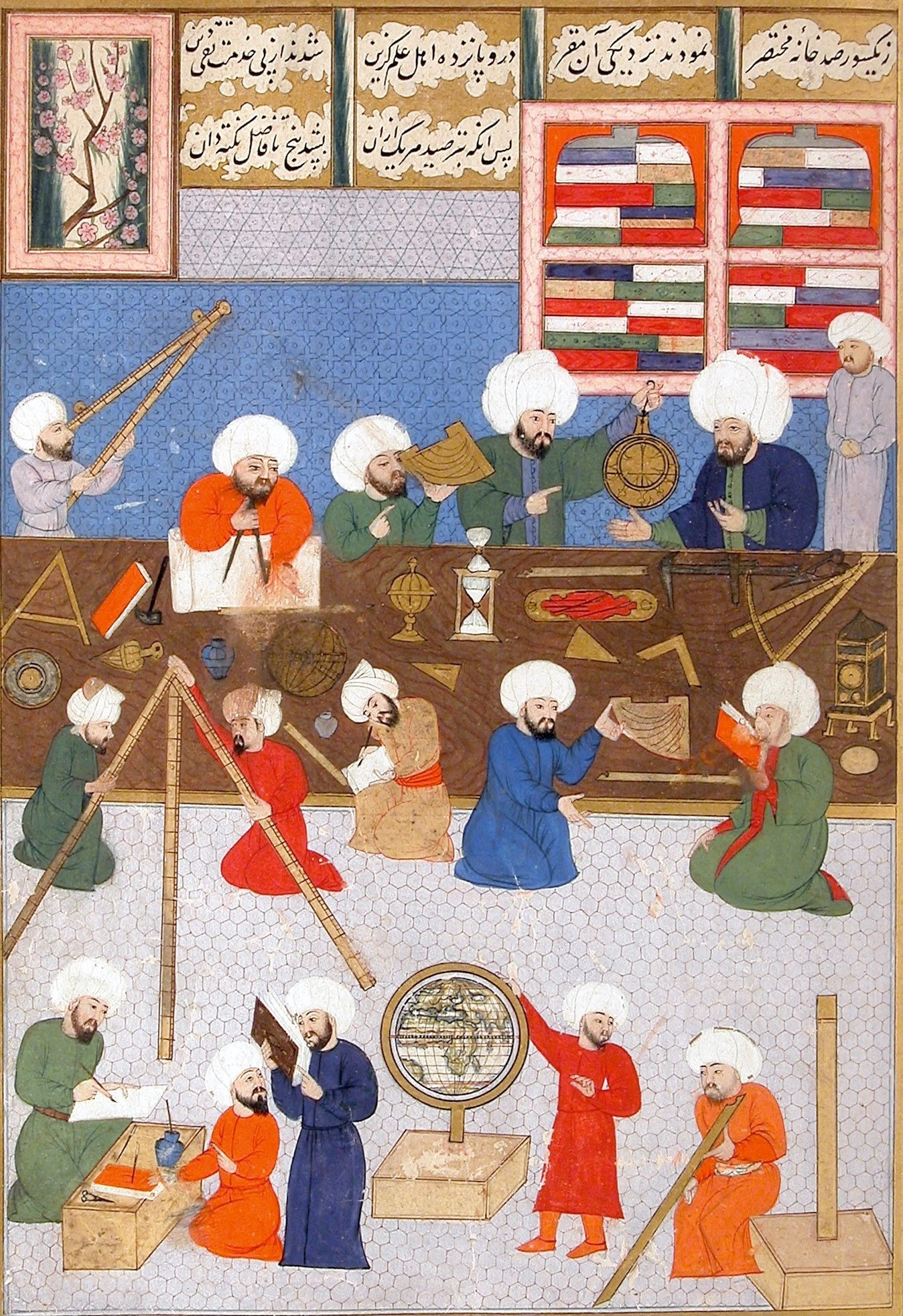
- Work in the observatory of Taqi ad-Din
- Born: 1526; Damascus, Ottoman Empire
- Died: 1585 (aged 59); Constantinople, Ottoman Empire
- Known for: Constantinople observatory
- Scientific career
- Fields: Mathematics, astronomy, engineering, mechanics, optics, natural philosophy

Taqi ad-Din Muhammad ibn Ma'ruf ash-Shami al-Asadi (Arabic: تقي الدين محمد بن معروف الشامي; Ottoman Turkish: تقي الدين محمد بن معروف الشامي السعدي; Turkish: Takiyüddin 1526–1585) was an Ottoman polymath active in Cairo and Constantinople. He was the author of more than ninety books on a wide variety of subjects, including astronomy, clocks, engineering, mathematics, mechanics, optics, and natural philosophy.

In 1574 the Ottoman Sultan Murad III invited Taqi ad-Din to build an observatory in the Ottoman capital, Constantinople. Taqi ad-Din constructed instruments such as an armillary sphere and mechanical clocks that he used to observe the Great Comet of 1577. He also used European celestial and terrestrial globes that were delivered to Constantinople in gift exchanges.

His major work from the use of his observatory is titled "The tree of ultimate knowledge [in the end of time or the world] in the Kingdom of the Revolving Spheres: The astronomical tables of the King of Kings [Murad III]" (Sidrat al-muntah al-afkar fi malkūt al-falak al-dawār– al-zij al-Shāhinshāhi). The work was prepared according to the results of the observations carried out in Egypt and Constantinople in order to correct and complete Ulugh Beg's 15th century work, the Zij-i Sultani. The first 40 pages of the work dealt with calculations, followed by discussions of astronomical clocks, heavenly circles, and information on three eclipses which he observed in Cairo and Istanbul.

As a polymath, Taqi al-Din wrote numerous books on astronomy, mathematics, mechanics, and theology. His method of finding coordinates of stars were reportedly so precise that he got better measurements than his contemporaries, Tycho Brahe and Nicolas Copernicus. Brahe is also thought to have been aware of Taqi al-Din's work.

Taqi ad-Din also described a steam turbine with the practical application of rotating a spit in 1551. He worked on and created astronomical clocks for his observatory. Taqi ad-Din also wrote a book on optics, in which he determined the light emitted from objects, proved the Law of Reflection observationally, and worked on refraction.

== Biography ==
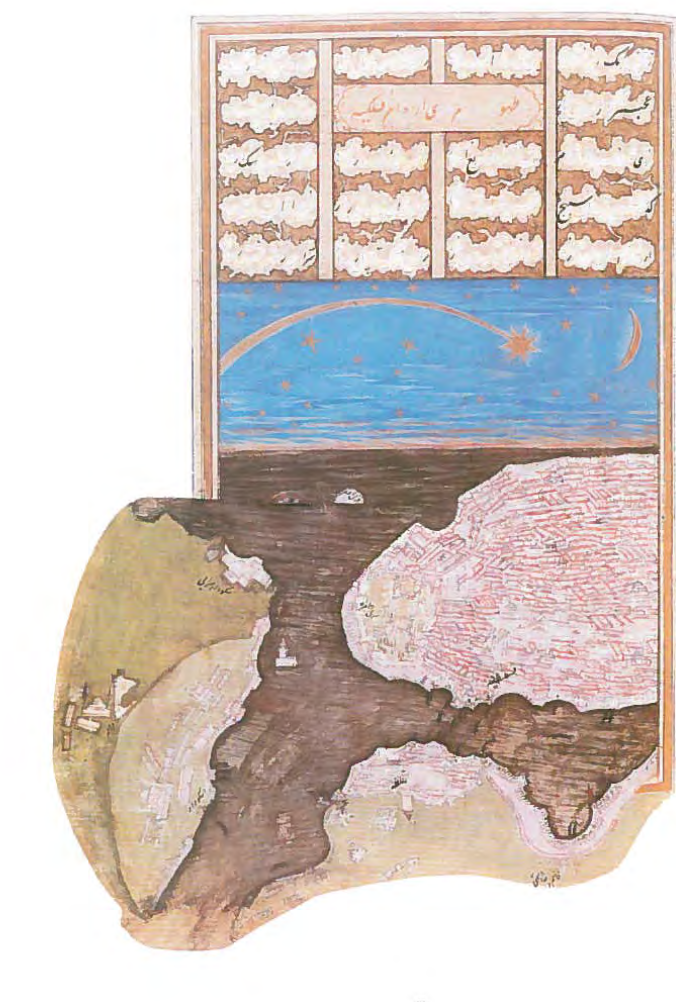
Observation of a comet from Constantinople (1577)

Taqī al-Dīn was born in Damascus in 1526 according to most sources. His ethnicity has been described as Arab, Kurdish, Syrian, and Turkish. In his treatise, titled "Rayḥānat al-rūḥ", Taqī al-Dīn himself claimed descent from the Ayyubids tracing his lineage back to the Ayyubid prince Nasir al-Din Mankarus ibn Nasih al-Din Khumartekin who ruled Abu Qubays in Syria during the 12th century. The Encyclopaedia of Islam makes no mention of his ethnicity, simply calling him, "...the most important astronomer of Ottoman Turkey".

Taqi ad-Din's education started in theology and as he went on he would gain an interest in the rational sciences. Following his interest, he would begin to study the rational sciences in Damascus and Cairo. During that time he studied alongside his father Maʿruf Efendi. Al-Dīn went on to teach at various madaris and served as a qadi, or judge, in Palestine, Damascus, and Cairo. He stayed in Egypt and Damascus for some time and while he was there he created work in astronomy and mathematics. His work in these categories would eventually become important. He became a chief astronomer to the Sultan in 1571 a year after he came to Istanbul, replacing Mustafa ibn Ali al-Muwaqqit.

Taqī al-Dīn maintained a strong bond with the people from the Ulama and statesmen. He would pass on information to Sultan Murad III who had an interest in astronomy but also in astrology. The information stated that Ulugh Beg Zij had particular observational errors. Al-Dīn made a suggestions that those errors could be fixed if there were new observations made. He also suggested that an observatory should be created in Constantinople to make that situation easier. Murad III would become a patron of the first observatory in Constantinople. He preferred that construction for the new observatory begin immediately. Since Murad III was the patron he would assist with finances for the project.

Taqī al-Dīn continued his studies at the Galata Tower while this was going on. His studies would continue until 1577 at the nearly complete observatory, which was called Dar al-Rasad al-Jadid. This new observatory contained a library that held books which covered astronomy and mathematics. The observatory, built in the higher part of Tophane in Istanbul, was made of two separate buildings. One building was big and the other one was small. Al-Dīn possessed some of the instruments used in the old Islamic observatories. He had those instruments reproduced and also created new instruments which would be used for observational purposes. The staff at the new observatory consisted of sixteen people. Eight of them were observers or rasids, four of them were clerks, and the last four were assistants.

Taqī al-Dīn approached his observations in a creative way and created new answers to astronomical problems due to the new strategies he created along with the new equipment he created as well. He would go on to create trigonometric tables based on decimal fractions. These tables placed the ecliptic at 23° 28' 40". The current value was 23° 27' showing that al-Dīn's instruments and methods were more precise. Al-Dīn used a new method to calculate solar parameters and to determine the magnitude of the annual movement of the sun's apogee as 63 seconds. The known value today is 61 seconds. Copernicus came up with 24 seconds and Tycho Brahe had 45 seconds but al-Dīn was more accurate than both.

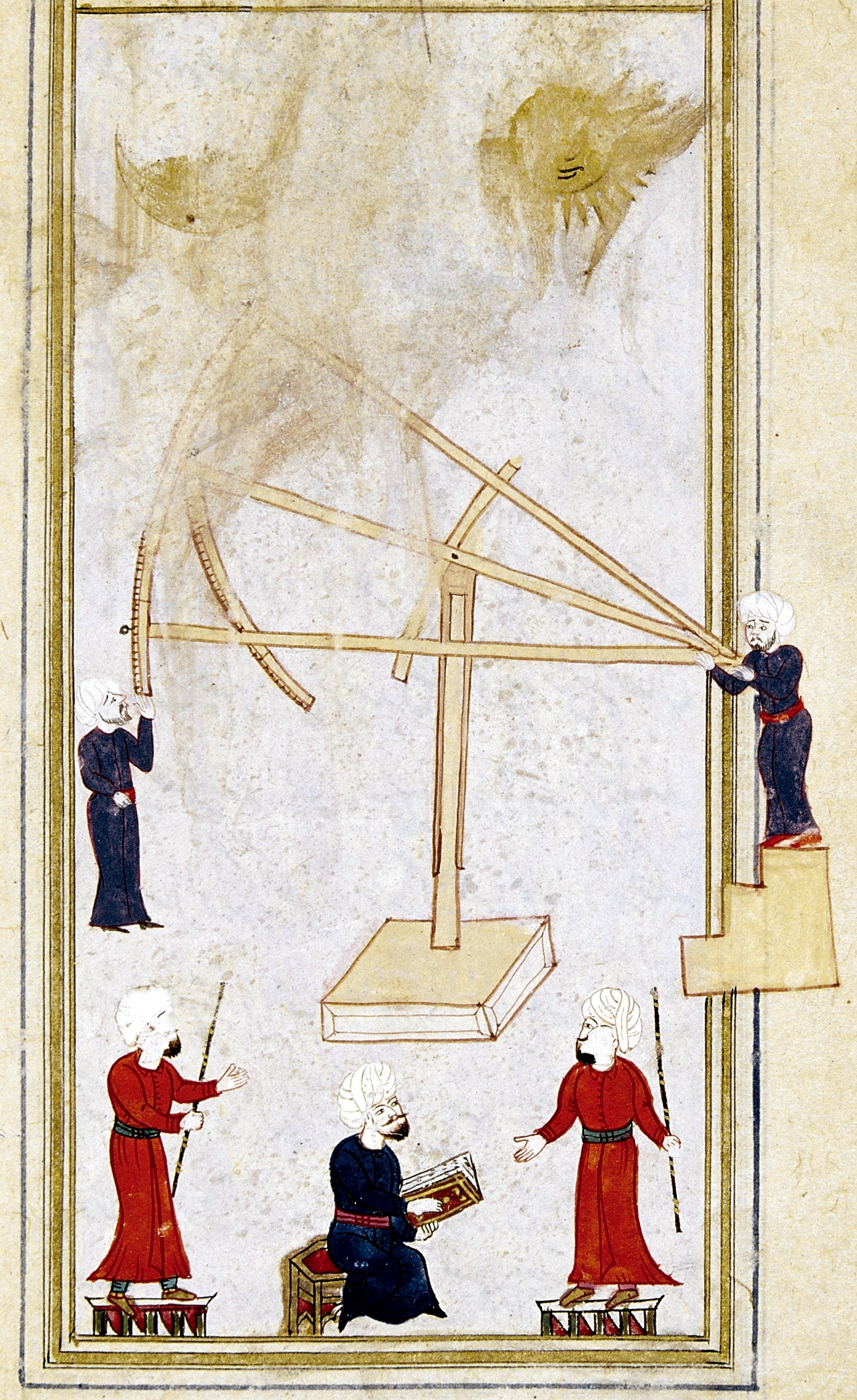
Ottoman observatory astronomers and astrologers headed by the müneccimbaşı (chief astrologer) using a quadrant.

The main purpose behind the observatory was to cater to the needs of the astronomers and provide a library and workshop so they could design and produce instruments. This observatory would become one of the largest ones in the Islamic world. It was complete in 1579. It would go on to run until January 22, 1580 which is when it was destroyed. Some say religious arguments was the reason why it was destroyed, but it really came down to political problems. A report by the grand vizier Sinan Pasha to Sultan Murad III goes into how the Sultan and the vizier attempted to keep Taqī Ad-Dīn away from the ulama because it seemed like they wanted to take him to trial for heresy. The vizier informs the sultan that Taqī Ad-Dīn wanted to go to Syria regardless of the sultan's orders. The vizier also warned the sultan that if Taqī Ad-Dīn went there, there is a possibility that he would be noticed by the ulama who would take him to trial.

Despite Taqī al-Dīn's originality, his influence seemed to be limited. There are only a small number of surviving copies of his works so they were not able to reach a wide variety of people. His commentaries that are known are very few. However, one of his works and a piece of a library that he owned reached western Europe pretty quickly. This was due to the manuscript collecting efforts of Jacob Golius, a Dutch professor of Arabic and mathematics at Leiden University. Golius traveled to Constantinople in the early seventeenth century. In 1629 he wrote a letter to Constantijn Huygens that talks about seeing Taqī Ad-Dīn's work on optics in Istanbul. He argued that he was not able to get ahold of it from his friends even after all his efforts. He must have succeeded in acquiring it later since Taqī al-Dīn's work on optics would eventually make it to the Bodleian Library as Marsh 119. It was originally in the Golius collection so it is clear that Golius eventually succeeded at acquiring it.

According to Salomon Schweigger, the chaplain of Habsburg ambassador Johann Joachim von Sinzendorf, Taqi al-Din was a charlatan who deceived Sultan Murad III and had him spent enormous resources.

At the age of 59, after authoring more than ninety books, Taqī al-Dīn died in 1585.

== The Constantinople Observatory ==
Taqī al-Dīn was both the founder and director of the Constantinople Observatory, which is also known as the Istanbul Observatory. This observatory is frequently said to be one of Taqī al-Dīn's most important contributions to sixteenth-century Islamic and Ottoman astronomy. In fact, it is known as one of the largest observatories in Islamic history. It is often compared to Tycho Brahe's Uraniborg Observatory, which was said to have been the home to the best instruments of its time in Europe. As a matter of fact, Brahe and Taqī al-Dīn have frequently been compared for their work in sixteenth-century astronomy. The founding of the Constantinople Observatory began when Taqī al-Dīn returned to Constantinople in 1570, after spending 20 years in Egypt developing his astronomy and mathematical knowledge. Shortly after his return, Sultan Selīm II appointed Taqī al-Dīn as the head astronomer (Müneccimbaşı), following the death of the previous head astronomer Muṣṭafā ibn ^{ҁ}Alī al-Muwaqqit in 1571.

During the early years of his position as head astronomer, Taqī al-Dīn worked in both the Galata Tower and a building overlooking Tophane. While working in these buildings, he began to gain the support and trust of many important Turkish officials. These newfound relationships lead to an imperial edict in 1569 from Sultan Murad III, which called for the construction of the Constantinople Observatory. This observatory became home to many important books and instruments, it had sixteen assistants who helped with the making of scientific instruments, as well as many renowned scholars of the time. While there is not much known of the architectural characteristics of the building, there are many depictions of the scholars and astronomical instruments present in the observatory. It was from this observatory that Taqī al-Dīn discovered the Great Comet of 1577, Murad III taught of the comet as a bad omen on the war with the Safavids (he also blamed Taqī al-Dīn for the plague that was occurring at the time). Due to political conflict, this observatory was short lived. It was closed in 1579 and, was demolished entirely by the state on 22 January 1580, only 11 short years after the imperial edict which called for its construction.

=== Politics ===
The rise and fall of Taqī al-Dīn and his observatory depended on political issues that surrounded him. Due to his father's occupation as a professor at the Damascene College of law Taqī al-Dīn spent much of his life in Syria and Egypt. During his trips to Istanbul he was able to make connections with many scholar-jurists. He was also able to use the private library of the Grand Vizier of the time, Semiz Ali Pasha. He then began working under Sultan Murad III's new Grand Vizier's, private mentor Sokollu. Continuing his research on observations of the heavens while in Egypt Taqī al-Dīn used the Galata tower and Sokollu's private residence. Although Murad III was the one who commanded an observatory to be built it was actually Sokollu who brought the idea to him knowing about his interest in science. The Sultan ultimately would provide Taqī al-Dīn with everything he needed from financial assistance for the physical buildings, to intellectual assistance making sure he had easy access to many types of books he would need. When the Sultan decided to create the observatory he saw it as a way to show off the power his monarchy had besides just financially backing it. Murad III showed his power by bringing Taqī al-Dīn and some of the most accomplished men in the field of astronomy together to work towards one goal and not only have them work well together but also make progress in the field. Murad III made sure that there was proof of his accomplishments by having his court historiographer Seyyid Lokman keep very detailed records of the work going on at the observatory. Seyyid Lokman wrote that his sultan's monarchy was much more powerful than others in Iraq, Persia, and Anatolia. He also claimed that Murad III was above other monarchs because the results of the observatory were new to the world and replaced many others.

=== Instruments used at the Observatory ===
Taqī al-Dīn used a variety of instruments to aid in his work at the observatory. Some were instruments that were already in use from European Astronomers while others he invented himself. While working in this observatory, Taqī al-Dīn not only operated many previously created instruments and techniques, but he also developed numerous new ones. Of these novel inventions, the automatic-mechanical clock is regarded as one of the most important developed in the Constantinople Observatory.

- Each of these instruments were first described by Ptolemy.
  - An Armillary Sphere- A model of celestial bodies with rings that represent longitude and latitude.
  - A Paralactic Ruler- also known as a Triquetrum was used to calculate the altitudes of celestial bodies.
  - An Astrolabe- Measures the inclined position of celestial bodies.
- These instruments were created by Muslim astronomers.
  - A Mural quadrant, a type of mural Instrument for measuring angles from 0 to 90 degrees.
  - An Azimuthally Quadrant
- Each of the instruments were created by Taqi al-Din to use for his own work.
  - A Parallel ruler
  - A Ruler Quadrant or Wooden Quadrant an instrument with two holes for the measurement of apparent diameters and eclipses.
  - A mechanical clock with a train of cogwheels which helped measure the true ascension of the stars.
  - Muşabbaha bi'l-menatık, an instrument with chords to determine the equinoxes, invented to replace the equinoctial armillary.
- A Sunaydi Ruler which was apparently a special type of instrument of an auxiliary nature, the function of which was explained by Alaeddin el-Mansur

== Contributions ==
=== Clock mechanics ===
==== Rise of clock use in the Ottoman Empire ====
Before the sixteenth century European mechanical clocks were not in high demand. This lack of demand was brought on by the extremely high prices and the lack of preciseness needed by the population who had to calculate when they would have to have the prayer. The use of hourglasses, water clocks, and sundials was more than enough to meet their needs.

It was not until around 1547 that the Ottomans started creating a high demand for them. Initially, it was started by the gifts brought by the Austrians but this would end up starting a market for the clocks. European clockmakers began to create clocks designed to the tastes and needs of the Ottoman people. They did this by showing both the phases of the moon and by utilizing Ottoman numbers.

==== Taqī al-Dīn's work ====
Due to this high demand for mechanical clocks, Taqī al-Dīn was asked by the Grand Vizier to create a clock that would show exactly when the call to prayer was. This would lead him to write his first book on the construction of mechanical clocks called, "al-Kawakib al-Durriya fi Bengamat al-Dawriyya" (The Brightest Stars for the Construction of Mechanical Clocks) in 1563 A.D. which he used throughout his research at the short-lived observatory. He believed that it would be advantageous to bring a "true hermetic and distilled perception of the motion of the heavenly bodies." In order to get a better understanding of how clocks ran Taqī al-Dīn took the time to gain knowledge from many European clock makers as well as going into the treasury of Semiz Ali Pasha and learning anything he could from the many clocks he owned.

==== Types of clocks examined ====
Of the clocks in the Grand Vizier's treasury Taqī al-Dīn examined three different types. Those three were weight-driven, spring-driven, and driven by lever escapement. He wrote of these three types of watches but also made comments on pocket watches and astronomical ones. As Chief Astronomer, Taqī al-Dīn created a mechanical astronomical clock. This clock was made to permit more precise measurements at the Constantinople observatory. As stated above the creation of this clock was thought to be one of the most important astronomical discoveries of the sixteenth century. Taqī al-Dīn constructed a mechanical clock with three dials which show the hours, minutes, and seconds, with each minute consisting of five seconds. After this clock it is not known whether Taqī al-Dīn's work in mechanical clocks was ever continued, given that much of the clockmaking after that time in the Ottoman Empire was taken over by Europeans.

=== Steam ===
In 1551 Taqī al-Dīn described a self-rotating spit that is important in the history of the steam turbine. In Al-Turuq al-samiyya fi al-alat al-ruhaniyya (The Sublime Methods of Spiritual Machines) al-Dīn describes this machine as well as some practical applications for it. The spit is rotated by directing steam into the vanes which then turns the wheel at the end of the axle. Al-Dīn also described four water-raising machines. The first two are animal driven water pumps. The third and fourth are both driven by a paddle wheel. The third is a slot-rod pump while the fourth is a six-cylinder pump. The vertical pistons of the final machine are operated by cams and trip-hammers, run by the paddle wheel. The descriptions of these machines predates many of the more modern engines. The screw pump, for example, that al-Dīn describes predates Agricola, whose description of the rag and chain pump was published in 1556. The two pump engine, which was first described by al-Jazarī, was also the basis of the steam engine.

== Important works ==
=== Astronomy ===
- Sidrat muntahā al-afkār fī malakūt al-falak al-dawwār (al-Zīj al-Shāhinshāhī): this is said to be one of Taqī al-Dīn's most important works in astronomy. He completed this book on the basis of his observations in both Egypt and Istanbul. The purpose of this work was to improve, correct, and ultimately complete Zīj-i Ulugh Beg, which was a project devised in Samarkand and furthered in the Constantinople Observatory. The first 40 pages of his writing focus on trigonometric calculations, with emphasis on trigonometric functions such sine, cosine, tangent, and cotangent.
- Jarīdat al-durar wa kharīdat al-fikar is a zīj that is said to be Taqī al-Dīn's second most important work in astronomy. This work contains the first recorded use of decimal fractions in trigonometric functions. He also gives the parts of degree of curves and angles in decimal fractions with precise calculations.
- Dustūr al-tarjīḥ li-qawā ^{ҁ} id al-tasṭīḥ is another important work by Taqī al-Dīn, which focuses on the projection of a sphere into a plane, among other geometric topics.
- Taqī al-Din is also accredited as the author of Rayḥānat al-rūḥ fī rasm al-sā ^{ҁ} āt ^{ҁ} alā mustawī al-suṭūḥ, which discusses sundials and their characteristics drawn on a marble surface.

=== Clocks and mechanics ===
- al-Kawākib al-durriyya fī waḍ ^{ҁ} al-bankāmāt al-dawriyya was written by Taqī al-Dīn in 1559 and addressed mechanical-automatic clocks. This work is considered the first written work on mechanical-automatic clocks in the Islamic and Ottoman world. In this book, he accredits Alī Pasha as a contributor for allowing him to use and study his private library and collection of European mechanical clocks.
- al-Ṭuruq al-saniyya fī al-ālāt al-rūḥāniyya is a second book on mechanics by Taqī al-Dīn that emphasizes the geometrical-mechanical structure of clocks, which was a topic previously observed and studied by Banū Mūsā and Ismail al-Jazari (Abū al-^{ҁ}Izz al-Jazarī).

=== Physics and optics ===
- Nawr ḥadīqat al-abṣar wa-nūr ḥaqīqat al-Anẓar was a work of Taqī al-Dīn that discussed physics and optics. This book discussed the structure of light, the relationship between light and color, as well as diffusion and global refraction.

== See also ==
- Inventions in the Muslim world
- Islamic astronomy
- Islamic science
