= Triquetrum =

Triquetrum ('three cornered') may refer to:

- Triquetrum (astronomy), an ancient astronomical instrument
- Triquetral bone, in the human wrist
