= Müneccimbaşı =

Astrologer of the Ottoman Empire

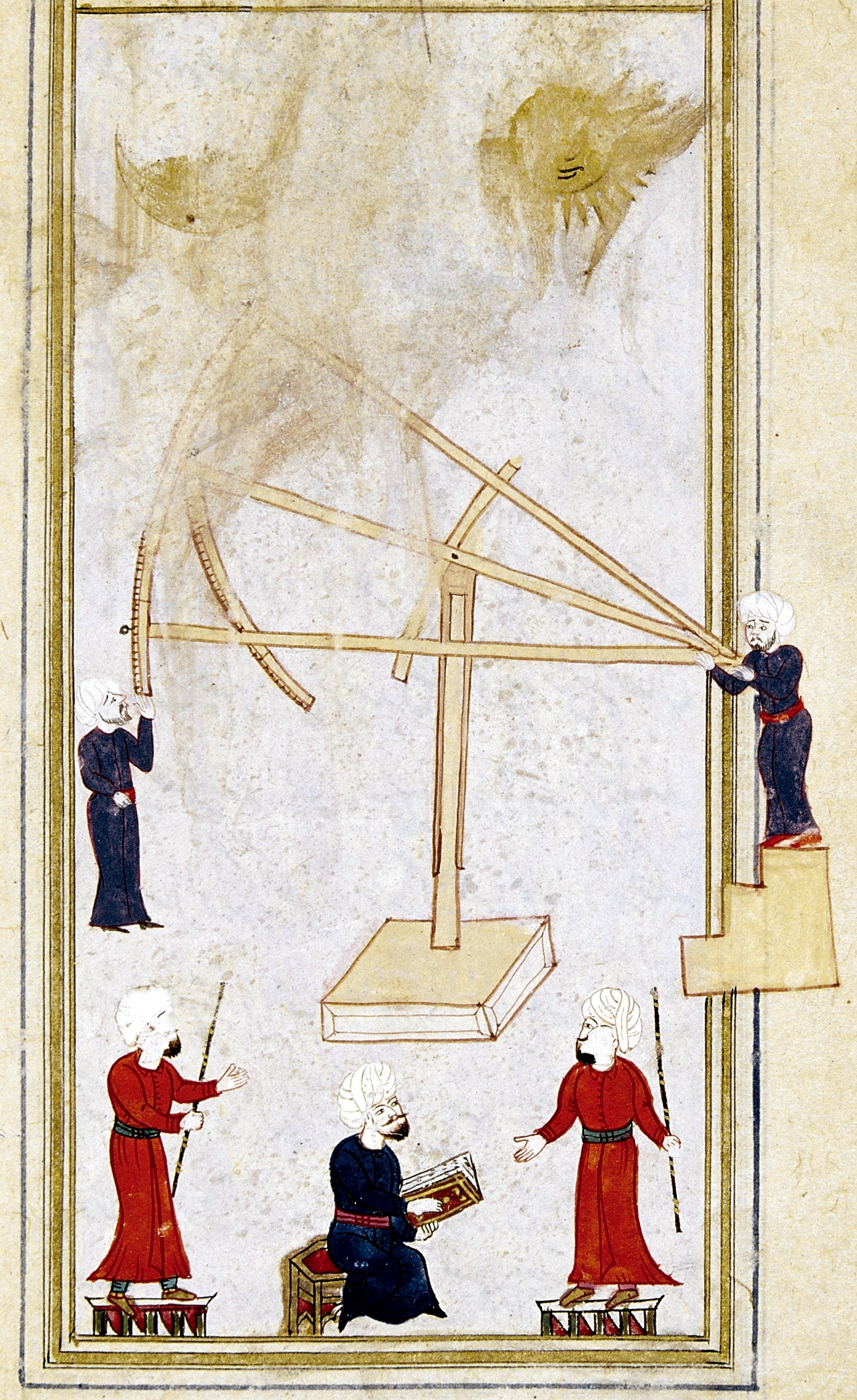
Ottoman Observatory astronomers and astrologers headed by the "müneccimbaşı" (chief astrologer) using the sextant.

Müneccimbaşı (sometimes also spelled as Müneccimbashi, Müneccimbasi, Munejjimbashi, or Munejjim-bashi) was the title given to the chief court astrologer in the Ottoman Empire. The title was held in succession from the 15th century until the demise of the Empire.

Since the late-17th century "müneccimbaşı" Ahmet Dede was also famous as a historian and man of letters and since he is cited along with his title in and regarding his works, the term may be used in some sources in reference solely to Müneccimbaşı Ahmed Dede.

== See also ==
- Istanbul observatory of Taqi al-Din
- Muwaqqit
- Officeholders
  - Müneccimbaşı Ahmed Dede
  - Mustafa ibn Ali al-Muwaqqit
  - Taqi ad-Din Muhammad ibn Ma'ruf
