= Constantinople observatory of Taqi ad-Din =

Medieval astronomical observatory

Coordinates: 41°01′55.7″N 28°58′34.6″E

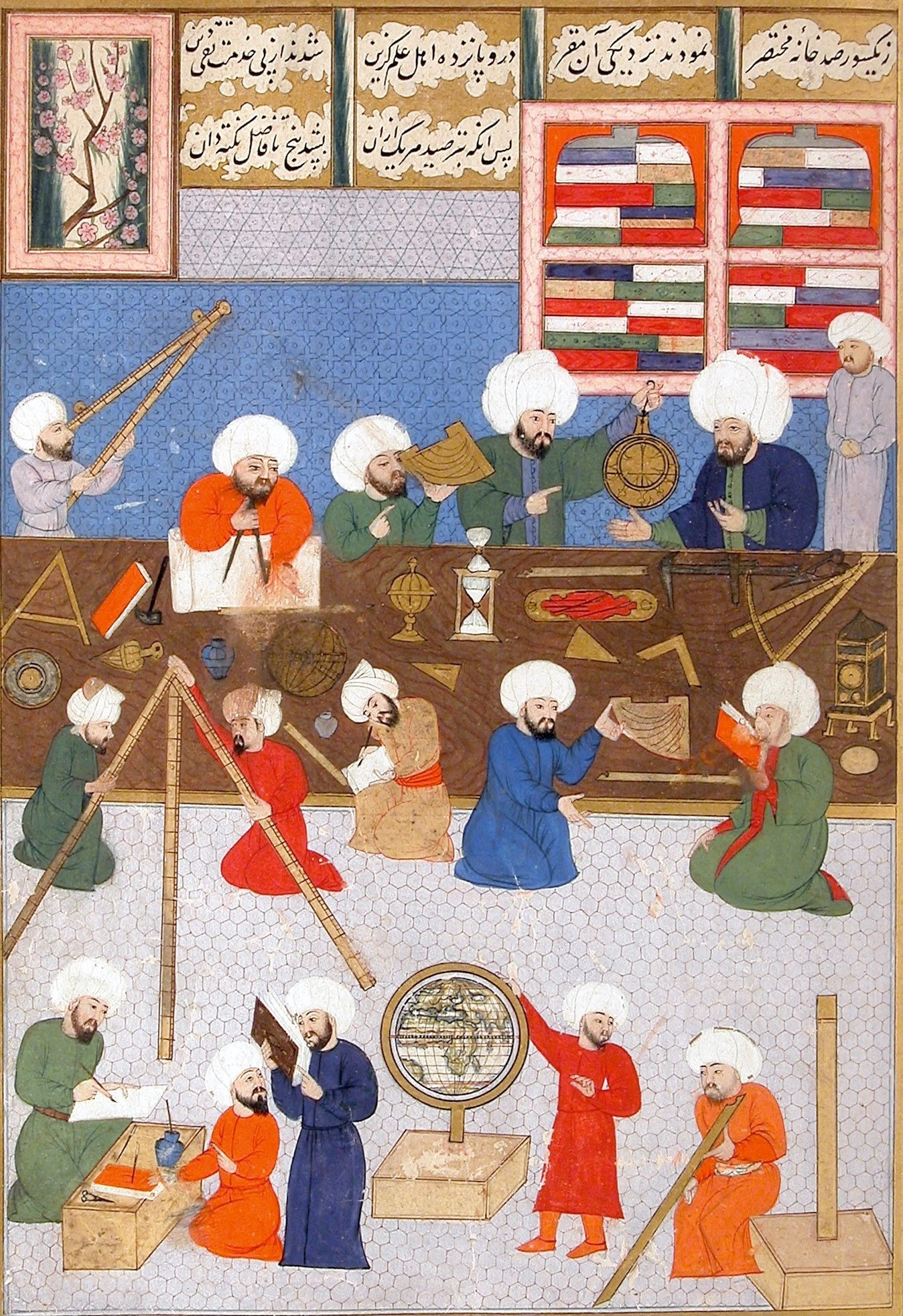
Work in the observatorium of Taqi ad-Din

The Constantinople observatory of Taqi ad-Din, founded in Constantinople (today Istanbul) by Taqi ad-Din Muhammad ibn Ma'ruf in 1577, was one of the largest astronomical observatories in the pre-modern world. However, it only existed for a few years and was destroyed in 1580.

== History ==
In 1574, Murad III became the Sultan of the Ottoman Empire. The empire's chief astronomer, Taqi ad-Din, petitioned the Sultan to finance the building of a great observatory to rival Ulugh Beg's Samarkand observatory. The Sultan approved, and construction was completed in 1577, at nearly the same time as Tycho Brahe's observatory at Uraniborg.

This observatory consisted of two large structures perched on a hill overlooking the European section of Constantinople and offering a wide view of the night sky. Much like a modern institution, the main building was reserved for the library and the living quarters of the staff, while the smaller building housed a collection of instruments built by Taqi ad-Din. These included a giant armillary sphere and an accurate mechanical astronomical clock for measuring the position and speed of the planets. With these instruments, Taqi ad-Din had hoped to update the old astronomical tables describing the motion of the planets, sun, and moon.

The observatory did not survive to advance the development of astronomy in the Muslim world. Within months of the observatory's completion, a comet with an enormous tail appeared in the sky and Sultan Murad III demanded a prognostication about it from his astronomer. "Working day and night without food and rest" Taqi ad-Din studied the comet and came up with the prediction that it was "an indication of well-being and splendor," and would mean a "conquest of Persia". Unfortunately, instead of splendor, a devastating plague followed in some parts of the empire, and several important persons died. This happened just as the king of Denmark built an observatory for Tycho Brahe that would pave the way for Kepler's elucidation of the orbits of planets.

== Instruments ==
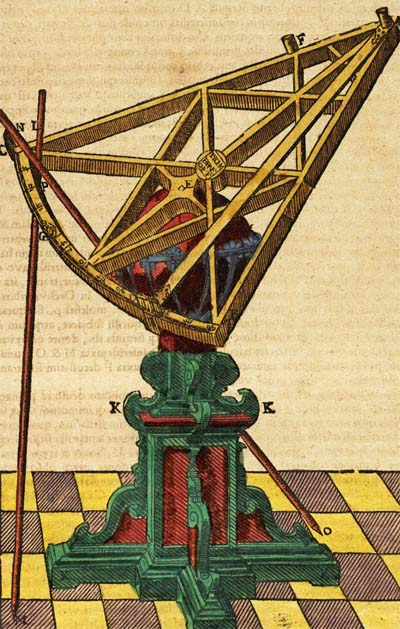
Taqi ad-Din invented a framed sextant similar to what Tycho Brahe later used as shown in the picture.

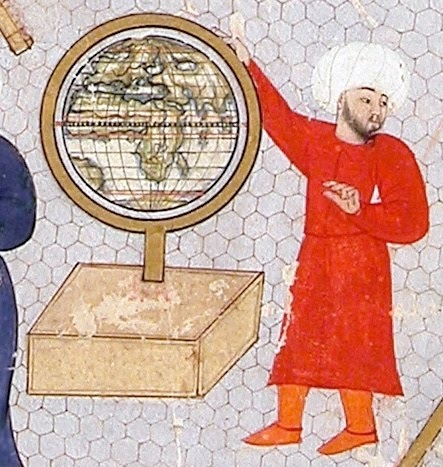
Globe at the Constantinople observatory

Taqi ad-Din wrote an important treatise on astronomical instruments entitled the Observational Instruments of the Emperor's Catalogue, which describes the astronomical instruments used in the Constantinople observatory of Taqi ad-Din. These included ancient instruments such as the armillary sphere, paralactic ruler and astrolabe; medieval Muslim instruments such as the universal astrolabe, azimuthal and mural quadrants, and sextants; and several instruments he invented himself, including the mushabbaha bi'l manattiq, a framed sextant with cords for the determination of the equinoxes similar to what Tycho Brahe later used, and a wooden quadrant for measuring azimuths and elevations. His most important astronomical instrument, however, is the "observational clock", which in his In the Nabk Tree of the Extremity of Thoughts, he describes as "a mechanical clock with three dials which show the hours, the minutes, and the seconds. We divided each minute into five seconds." This was used for measuring the right ascension of the stars. This is considered one of the most important innovations in 16th century practical astronomy, as at the start of the century clocks were not accurate enough to be used for astronomical purposes.

A "remarkably modern-looking" terrestrial globe of the Earth, one of the earliest of its kind, was constructed by Taqi ad-Din at the Constantinople observatory of Taqi ad-Din.

== Observations ==
Taqi ad-Din made use of his new "observational clock" to produce a zij (named Culmination of Thoughts in the Kingdom of Rotating Spheres) more accurate than his predecessors, Tycho Brahe and Nicolaus Copernicus. Taqi ad-Din was also the first astronomer to employ a decimal point notation in his observations rather than the sexagesimal fractions used by his contemporaries and predecessors. He also made use of Al-Biruni's method of "three points observation". In The Culmination of Thoughts in the Kingdom of Rotating Spheres, Taqi ad-Din described the three points as "two of them being in opposition in the ecliptic and the third in any desired place on the ecliptic. He used this method to calculate the eccentricity of the Sun's orbit and the annual motion of the apogee, and so did Tycho Brahe and Copernicus shortly afterwards, though Taqi ad-Din's values were more accurate, due to his observational clock and other more accurate instruments.

== See also ==
- Astronomy in medieval Islam
- Great Comet of 1577
- Taqi ad-Din Muhammad ibn Ma'ruf
