= Sibt al-Maridini =

Egyptian-born Arab astronomer (1423–1506 AD)

- Born: 1423; Possibly Damascus, Mamluk Sultanate?
- Died: c. 1495; Possibly Cairo, Mamluk Sultanate?
- Occupations: Astronomer, mathematician
- Known for: Writing about astronomy and mathematics

A manuscript of Sharh al-Rahbiyah by Sibt al-Maridini

Sibt al-Maridini, full name Muḥammad ibn Muḥammad ibn Aḥmad Abū ʿAbd Allāh Badr [Shams] al‐Dīn al‐Miṣrī al‐Dimashqī (1423 – 1506 AD), was an Egyptian-born astronomer and mathematician. His father came from Damascus. The name "Sibt al-Maridini" means "the son of Al-Mardini's daughter". His maternal grandfather, Abdullah al-Maridini, was a reputed astronomer of the eighth century AH. He was a disciple of the astronomer Ibn al-Majdi (d. 850/1506), according to tradition.

Sibt al-Maridini taught mathematics and astronomy in the Great Mosque of al-Azhar, Cairo. He was also a timekeeper (muwaqqit) of the mosque. He wrote no fewer than fifty treatises in astronomy (sine quadrants, sundials, astronomical tables and prayer times) and wrote at least twenty-three mathematics textbooks.

Al-Sakhawy counted two hundred books that were written by Sibt al-Maridini, on Islamic law, astronomy, and mathematics. Libraries that specialize in ancient manuscripts, all over the world, have transcripts of his works.

Sibt al-Mardini’s declared that “the opinion of the muezzins (those who call people to prayer) is less correct than that of the legal scholars and it is the latter that should be used as the basis for the determination of prayer time”.

== Works ==
- Sharh al-Rahbiyah a commentary on the work of al-Rahbi (d. 579 AH/1183 AD) on Fara'id (shares of inheritance)
- Sharh al-Muqni' fi 'ilm al-Jabr wa al-Muqabalah (commentary on al-Muqni' about the science of calculation by completion and balancing. al-Muqni' is a work of Shihabuddin ibn Ahmad ibn al-Hayim.)
- Daqa'iq al-Haqa'iq
- Risāla fī al‐ʿAmal bi‐ʾl‐rubʿ al‐mujayyab (on using the sine quadrant)
- Raqāʾiq al‐ḥaqāʾiq (on calculating with degrees and minutes)
- Zubd al‐raqāʾiq (this may be an extract from the previous treatise)
- Muqaddima (introduction) to sine problems and spherical relations
- al‐Ṭuruq al‐saniyya (on sexagesimal calculations)
- al‐Nujūm al‐ẓāhirāt (on the muqanṭarāt quadrant)
- Qaṭf al‐ẓāhirāt (apparently an extract from the previous treatise)
- Hāwī al‐mukhtaṣarāt (another discussion of the muqanṭarāt quadrant)
- Iẓḥār al‐sirr al‐mawḍūʿ (use of a specialized quadrant)
- Hidāyat al‐ʿāmil (on another kind of specialized quadrant)
- Hidāyat al‐sāʾil (on the quadrant mentioned in the previous entry)
- al‐Maṭlab (on the sine quadrant)
- al‐Tuḥfa al‐manṣūriyya (on quadrants)
- Muqaddima (introduction to construction of sundials)
- a treatise on the equatorial circle
- a treatise on the quadrant, astrolabe, and calendar
