= Shams al-Din Abu Abd Allah al-Khalili =

Arab astronomer (1320–1380)

Al-Khalili
- شمس الدين عبد الله محمد بن محمد الخليلي
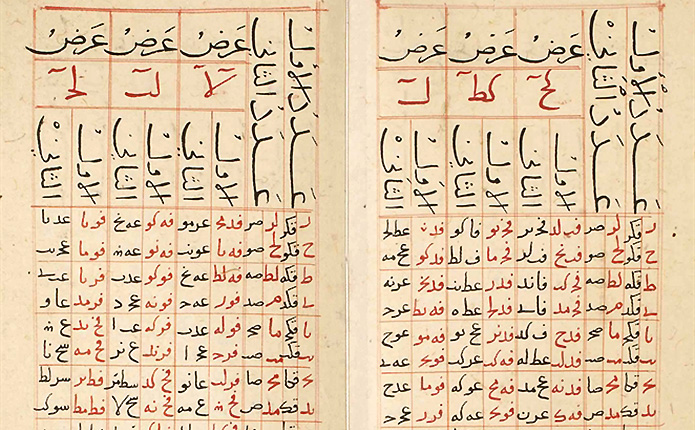
- A table compiled by al-Khalili showing the direction of the qibla from various longitudes and latitudes
- Born: 1320
- Died: 1380 (aged 59–60)

Academic work
- Era: Islamic Golden Age
- Main interests: Astronomer; muwaqqit

Shams al-Dīn Abū ʿAbd Allāh Muḥammad ibn Muḥammad al-Khalīlī (Arabic: شمس الدين عبد الله محمد بن محمد الخليلي; 1320–1380) was a Mamluk-era Syrian astronomer who compiled astronomical tables. He worked for most of his life as a muwaqqit (a religious timekeeper) at the Umayyad Mosque in Damascus.

Little is known about his life.

== Work ==
Al-Khalili is known for two sets of mathematical tables he constructed, both totalling roughly 30,000 entries. He tabulated all the entries made by the celebrated Egyptian Muslim astronomer Ibn Yunus, except for the entries that al-Khalili made himself for the city of Damascus. He computed 13,000 entries into his 'Universal Tables' of different auxiliary functions which allowed him to generate the solutions of standard problems of spherical astronomy for any given latitude. In addition to this, he created a 3,000 entry table that gave the qibla (the direction of the city of Mecca) for all latitudes and longitudes for all the Muslim countries of the 14th century. (Note: Knowledge of the direction of the qibla is essential in Islam because Muslims pray in the direction of Mecca.) The values present in al-Khalili’s tables have been determined to be accurate up to three or four significant figures. It is not known how exactly al-Khalili went about calculating each of his entries.

== Sources ==
- Van Brummelen, G. (1991). "The numerical structure of al-Khalili's auxiliary tables" (thesis). Rivista Internazionale di Storia della Scienza. 28 (3): 667–697. ISSN 0031-9414.
- King, David A. (1973). "Al-Khalili's Auxiliary Tables for Solving Problems of Spherical Astronomy". Journal for the History of Astronomy. 4 (2): 99–110. Bibcode:1973JHA.....4...99K. doi:10.1177/002182867300400202. ISSN 0021-8286. S2CID 116031361.
- King, David A. (1975). "Al-Khalīlī's Qibla Table". Journal of Near Eastern Studies. 34 (2): 81–122. doi:10.1086/372399. ISSN 0022-2968. JSTOR 545208. S2CID 162253735.
