= Muwaqqit =

Historical astronomer and timekeeper in Islamic institutions

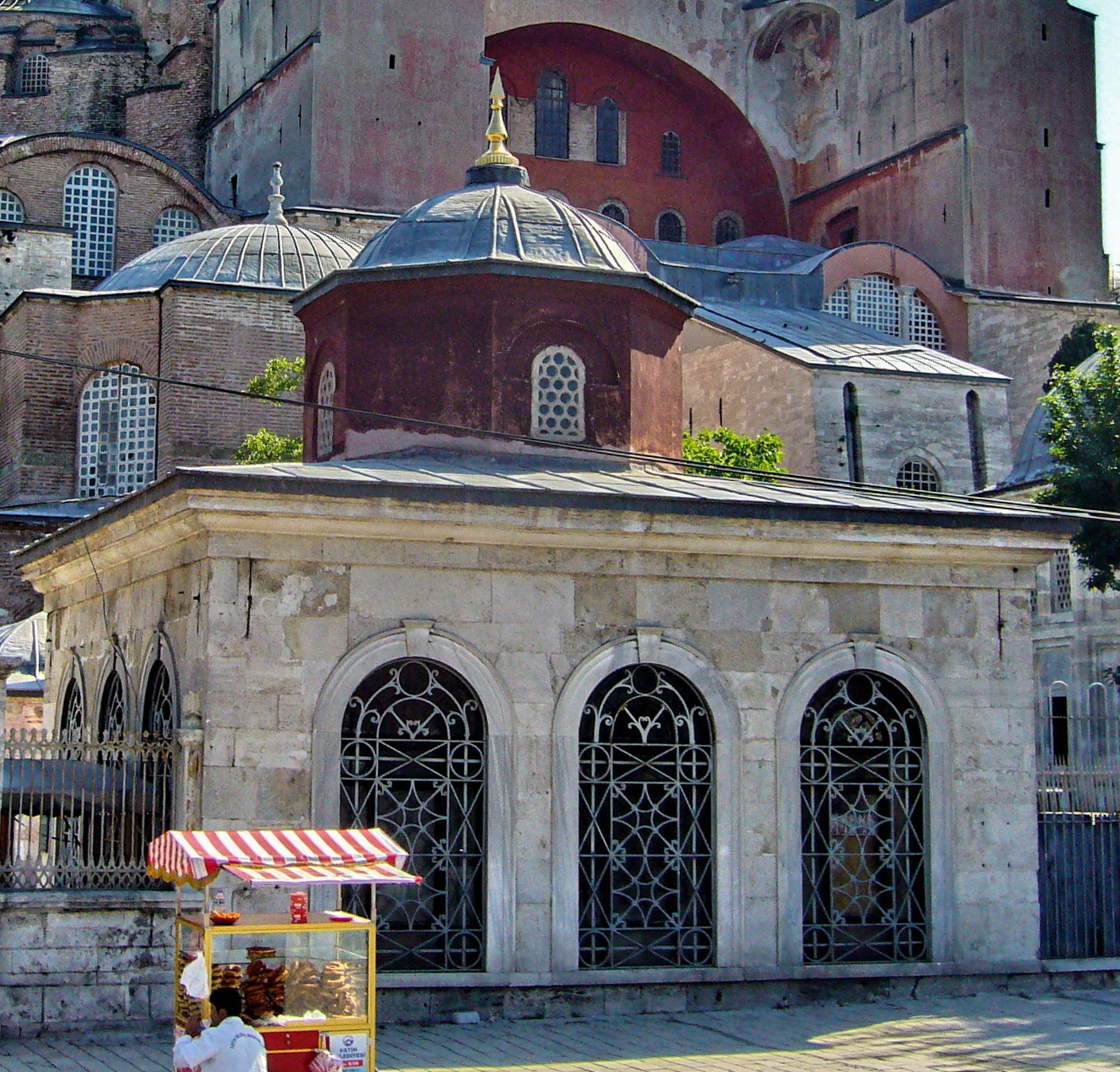
The muvakkithane ("lodge of the muwaqqit") in Hagia Sophia, Istanbul

In the history of Islam, a muwaqqit (Arabic: مُوَقَّت, more rarely ميقاتي mīqātī; Turkish: muvakit) was an astronomer tasked with the timekeeping and the regulation of prayer times in an Islamic institution like a mosque or a madrasa. Unlike the muezzin (reciter of the call to prayer) who was usually selected for his piety and voice, a muwaqqit was selected for his knowledge and skill in astronomy.

Not all mosques had a muwaqqit. The office was first recorded in the late 13th century in the Mosque of Amr ibn al-As in the Mamluk Sultanate of Cairo and then spread to various parts of the Muslim world. Even then, many major mosques only relied on muezzins to determine prayer times using traditional methods, such as observing shadow lengths and twilight phenomena. The lack of historical sources and research makes it difficult to ascertain the specific functions and roles of the muwaqqit. There is uncertainty among historians of science whether the muwaqqit was a specialised office whose holder dealt exclusively with astronomical matters, or whether it was part of a broader role of a teacher (mudarris) who also worked and taught in other fields.

During its peak in the fourteenth and the fifteenth centuries, prominent scientists held the post of muwaqqit. For example, ibn al-Shatir (1304–1375) and Shams al-Din al-Khalili (1320–1380) formed a team of muwaqqits in the Umayyad Mosque of Damascus. Syria and Egypt were the major centres of muwaqqit activity in these centuries, while the office spread to Palestine, Hejaz, Tunis, and Yemen. The office continued to be recorded up to the nineteenth century, although muwaqqits produced fewer treatises and instruments than in earlier times. Today, mosques use prayer time-tables produced by religious or scientific agencies or clocks programmed for this purpose. These allow for the exact determination of prayer times without the specialised skills of a muwaqqit.

== Background ==
Muslims observe salah, the daily ritual prayer, at prescribed times based on the hadith or the tradition of Muhammad (c. 570–632). Each day, there are five obligatory prayers with specific ranges of permitted times determined by daily astronomical phenomena. For example, the time for the maghrib prayer starts after sunset and ends when the red twilight has disappeared.

Because the start and end times for prayers are related to the solar diurnal motion, they vary throughout the year and depend on the local latitude and longitude when expressed in local time. The term mīqāt in the sense of "time of a prayer" is attested to in the Quran and hadith, although the Quran does not explicitly define those times. The term ʻilm al-mīqāt refers to the study of determining prayer times based on the position of the Sun and the stars in the sky and has been recorded since the early days of Islam.

Before the muwaqqits appeared, the muezzin had been the office most associated with the regulation of the prayer times. The post can be traced back to Muhammad's lifetime and its role and history are well documented. The main duty of a muazzin is to recite the adhan to announce the beginning of a prayer time. Before the use of a loudspeaker, this was usually done from the top of a minaret. The minaret provided the muezzin with a vantage point to observe phenomena such as sunset which marks the start time of maghrib.

== Duties ==
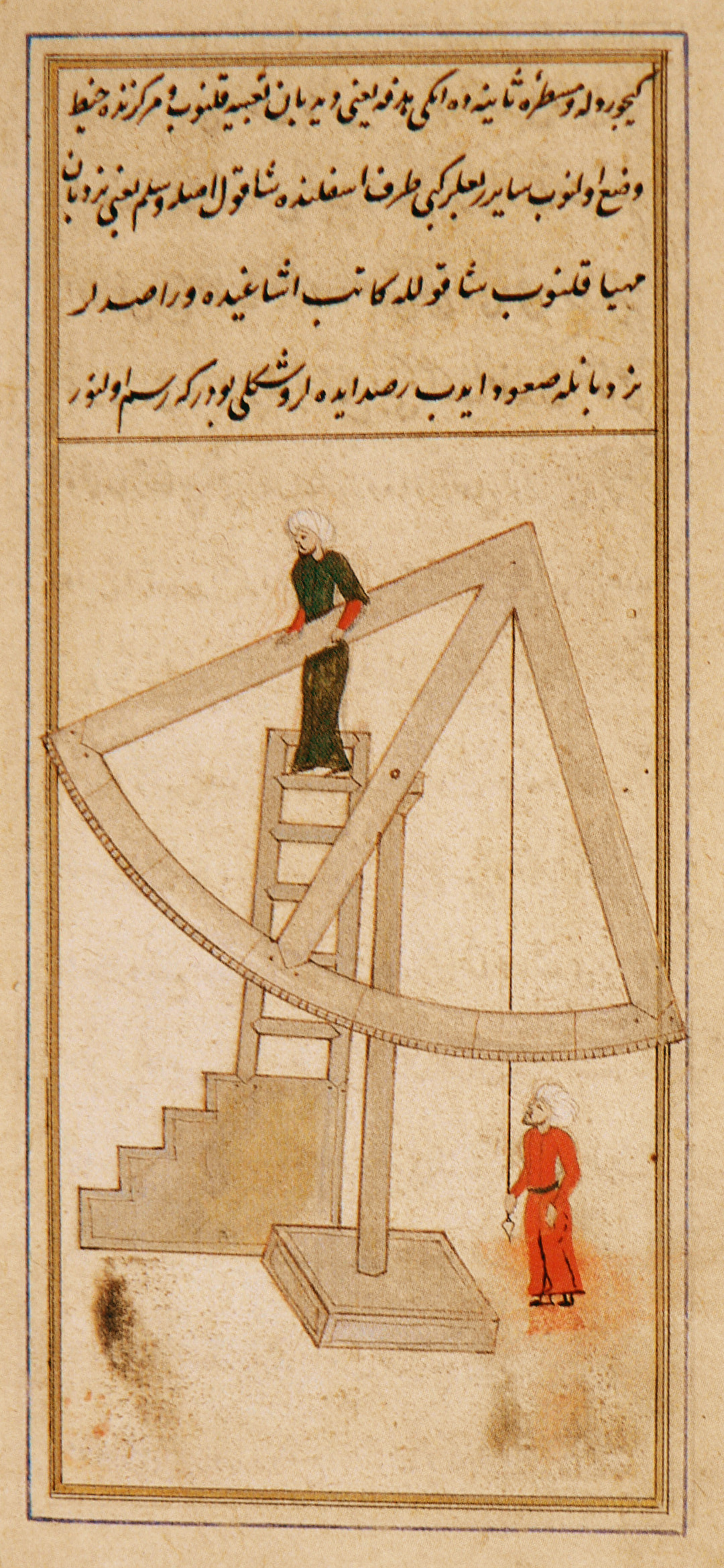
The quadrant, often produced and used by muwaqqits.

The main duty of the muwaqqit was timekeeping and the regulation of daily prayer times in mosques, madrasas, or other institutions using astronomy and other exact sciences. At its zenith in the fourteenth and fifteenth centuries, major mosques often employed prominent astronomers as muwaqqits. In addition to regulating prayer times, they wrote treatises on astronomy, especially on timekeeping and the use of related instruments such as quadrants and sundials. They were also responsible for other religious matters related to their astronomical expertise, such as the keeping of the Islamic calendar and the determination of the qibla (the direction to Mecca used for prayers).

David A. King, a historian of astronomy, presents the muwaqqit as a specialised profession, a mosque astronomer "in the service of Islam" who produced a large body of treatises and instruments, even though their work did not necessarily influence the practices of the muezzins and the fuqahā who largely used traditional methods. The knowledge of a muwaqqit was passed to his students who specifically intended to be the next generation of the profession. King's description is based on his research into the primary works of the muwaqqits and contemporary Islamic legal texts.

On the other hand, historian of science, Sonja Brentjes, proposes that muwaqqit is to be seen as "only one facet of another persona, mostly that of a mudarris (teacher)". The astronomical keeping of prayer times as well as the construction and maintenance of a mosque's astronomical instruments were just a normal part of academic activities in Muslim cities of the time. Someone titled muwaqqit was also likely to be highly learned in other disciplines, including fiqh and philosophy. The discipline of ʻilm al-mīqāt was widely learned and not only by someone who aspired to be a muwaqqit; a muezzin could well have had an identical education as a muwaqqit. Brentjes' assessment is based on secondary biographies of the muwaqqits during the Mamluk era, including the works of al-Sakhawi, a prominent 15th-century author and hadith scholar. Both King and Brentjes say that it is difficult to ascertain the role of the muwaqqits due to the lack of research and historical sources on the topic.

=== Salary ===
Little information is available about the salary of the muwaqqits. King could only provide several figures given in waqfiyyas or financial documents of mosques in fifteenth and sixteenth century Cairo. The Mosque of the Emir of Qanim paid a muwaqqit 200 dirhams (silver coin) per month, compared to 900 for an imam, 500 for a khatib, 200 for a muezzin and 300 for a servant mentioned in the same document. Other figures King found were cumulative: 1400 dirham divided among about 16 muezzins and muwaqqits, and 600 dirham divided among an unknown number of muwaqqits. According to Brentjes, these remunerations were relatively low, leading a muwaqqit to take up other jobs at the same time, including teaching. The data presented by King is limited to one city and does not cover mosques with prominent muwaqqits, such as the Umayyad Mosque in Damascus.

=== Relations with the muezzin ===
The responsibilities of a muwaqqit were related to those of the muezzins who announced the start time of a prayer by reciting the adhan. Unlike the office of the muwaqqit which required special knowledge in astronomy, the muezzin were typically chosen for their piety and beautiful voice. Mosques did not always have muwaqqits. Even major mosques often relied on a muezzin's traditional knowledge to determine prayer times, such as observing shadow lengths for daytime prayers, twilight phenomena for night prayers, and lunar stations for general timekeeping at night. Brentjes speculates that the muwaqqit might have evolved from a specialised muezzin, and that there might not have been a clear delineation between the two offices. Some celebrated muwaqqits, including Shams al-Din al-Khalili and ibn al-Shatir, were known to have once been muezzins, and many individuals held both offices simultaneously.

== History ==
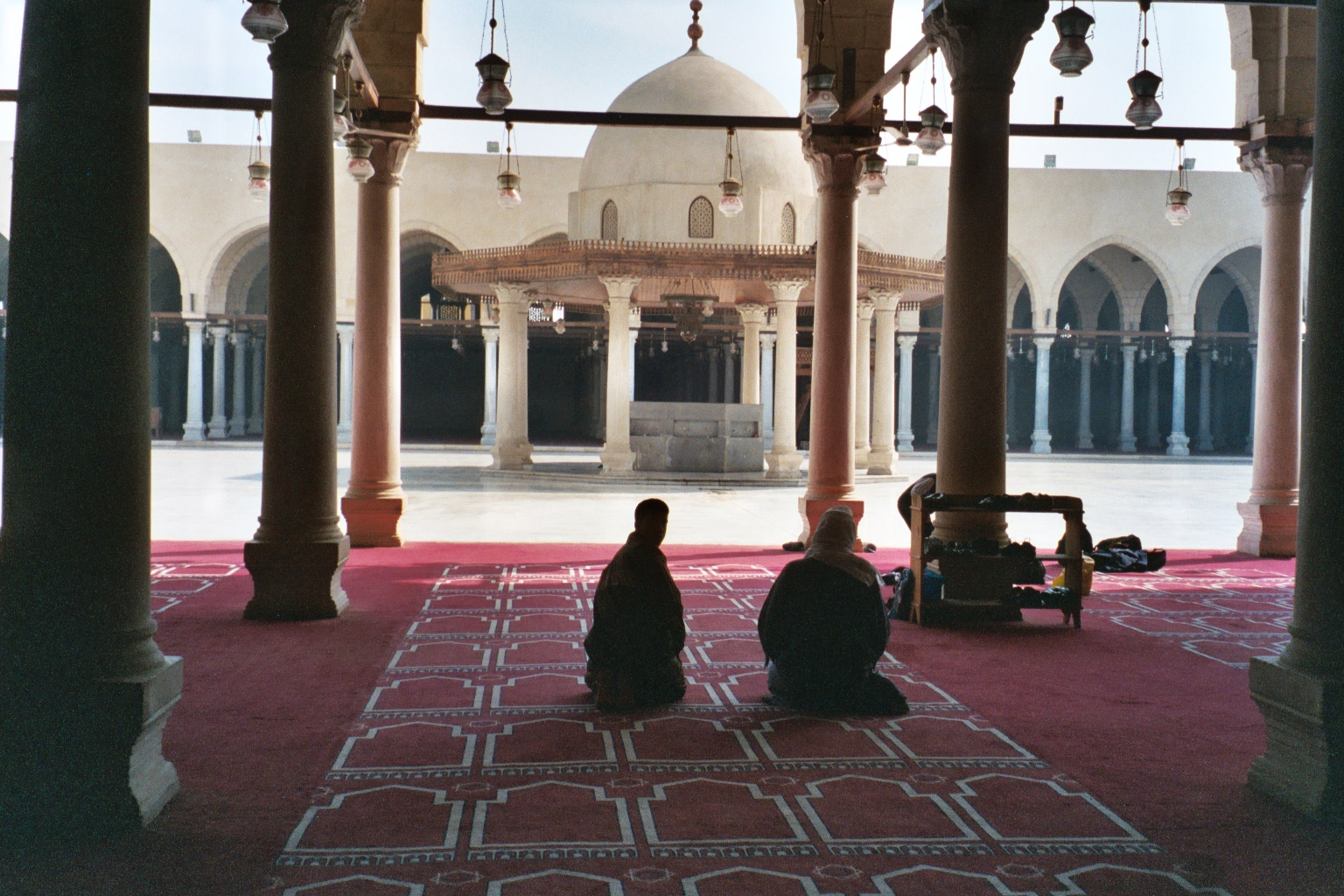
The Mosque of Amr ibn al-As in Fustat (today part of Cairo), where the official title of muwaqqit was first recorded.

Unlike the muazzin whose history and origin has been well-studied, the origin of the muwaqqit is unclear. The earliest known record shows that the office already existed in the thirteenth century Mamluk Sultanate. According to King, the first muwaqqit known by name was Abu al-Hasan ali ibn Abd al-Malik ibn Sim'un (died 685 AH or 1286/1287 CE), a muwaqqit in the Mosque of Amr ibn al-As in Fustat, Egypt for 30 years. His son Muhammad al-Wajih (died 701 AH or 1301/1302 CE) and grandson Muhammad al-Majd also served as muwaqqit there. At the same time, similar offices likely existed in Al-Andalus and the Maghreb with different names. In Al-Andalus, in the late 13th century, astronomers Ahmad and Husayn—father and son from the Ibn Baso family—computed prayer times for the Great Mosque of Granada. Manuscripts refer to them with various titles, including al-muadhdhin al-mubarak, al-imam al-mu'addil al-mubarak, al-shaykh al-mu'addil, amin al-awqat, and muwaqqit. The University of al-Qarawiyyin in Fez employed the astronomer Muhammad al-Sanhaji (fl. c. 1307) in a similar position with the title al-mu'addil. A manual of professions from around 1300 by the Egyptian author Ibn al-Ukhuwwa mentioned the post of the muazzin and its duties and requirements but did not mention the muwaqqit.

=== In the 14th and 15th centuries ===
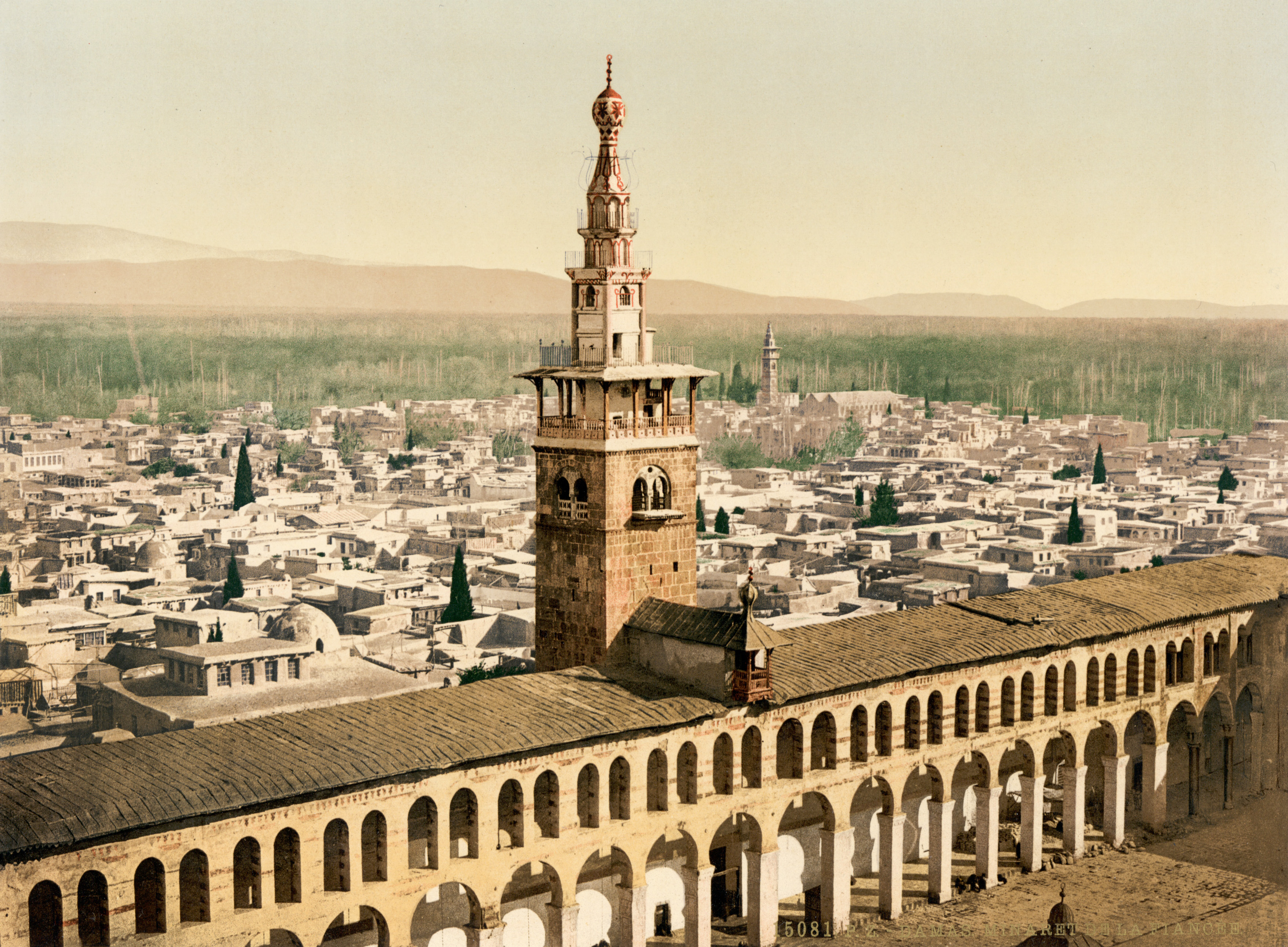
The Umayyad Mosque in Damascus, a major centre of muwaqqit activity in the 14th and 15th centuries.

If the office of the muwaqqit indeed originated in Egypt, it soon spread to Syria and Palestine. The Ibrahimi Mosque in Hebron employed the muwaqqit Ibrahim ibn Ahmad. In 1306, he made a copy of an astronomical work by Nasir al-Din ibn Sim'un (died 1337), a member of the same family as the early muwaqqits in Fustat. Another muwaqqit, Ibn al-Sarraj (fl. c. 1325), served in Aleppo where he designed and created various astronomical instruments and wrote treatises about their construction and use.

Still in Syria, Ibn al-Shatir (1304–1375) led a team of muwaqqits in the Umayyad Mosque, Damascus. He wrote two zijes (astronomical tables) and made astrolabes and sundials. Apart from timekeeping, he also worked on planetary theories and wrote a treatise on the movements of the Sun, the moon, and the planets. He moved away from Ptolemaic geocentrism and produced models which were still geocentric but were mathematically identical to those later proposed by Copernicus (1473 – 1543). According to King, Ibn al-Shatir's works represent the "culmination" of planetary astronomy in the Islamic world. Ibn al-Shatir's colleague Shams al-Din al-Khalili (1320–1380), a muwaqqit of the Yalbugha Mosque before joining the Umayyad Mosque, wrote prayer timetables for Damascus and tables for finding direction to Mecca from any locality. The activities of the muwaqqits were not universally approved of by Islamic jurists. The qadi (judge) of Damascus Taj al-Din al-Subki denounced the muwaqqits, whose ranks according to him were filled with astrologers (munajjimun) and magicians (kuhhan). Astrological topics were inevitably read by astronomers of the time because they were often included in astronomy textbooks, and a few muwaqqits were recorded to have studied astrology.

By the end of the fourteenth century, the activity of the muwaqqits had been recorded in Egypt, Syria, Palestine, the Hejaz (including Mecca and Medina), Tunis, and Yemen. In the following century, the practice spread to Asia Minor. According to King, there is no evidence of muwaqqit activity in more easterly parts of the Islamic world, including Iraq, Iran, India and Central Asia. According to Brentjes, it is possible that the discipline of miqat spread eastwards as part of an exchange prompted by trade, pilgrimage, and travel for knowledge even though no written evidence has been found.

In the fifteenth century, the center of muwaqqit activities shifted to Egypt, especially the al-Azhar Mosque in Cairo, but their scientific outputs were reduced. Among the well-known muwaqqits, Sibt al-Maridini (1423–1506) of Al-Azhar wrote treatises on timekeeping. He used simpler astronomical methods which became popular in Egypt and Syria. King speculates that he might have "unwittingly" contributed to the decline of astronomy in the Middle East because his works outcompeted more advanced texts. Other muwaqqits recorded in various mosques in fifteenth century Cairo include al-Kawm al-Rishi, 'Izz al-Din al-Wafa'i, al-Karadisi, and Abd al-Qadir al-Ajmawi. In addition, Egyptian astronomers Ibn al-Majdi and Ibn Abi al-Fath al-Sufi wrote extensively on religious timekeeping using more advanced astronomy than Sibt al-Maradani, but they were not formally attached to any mosque.

=== After the fifteenth century ===
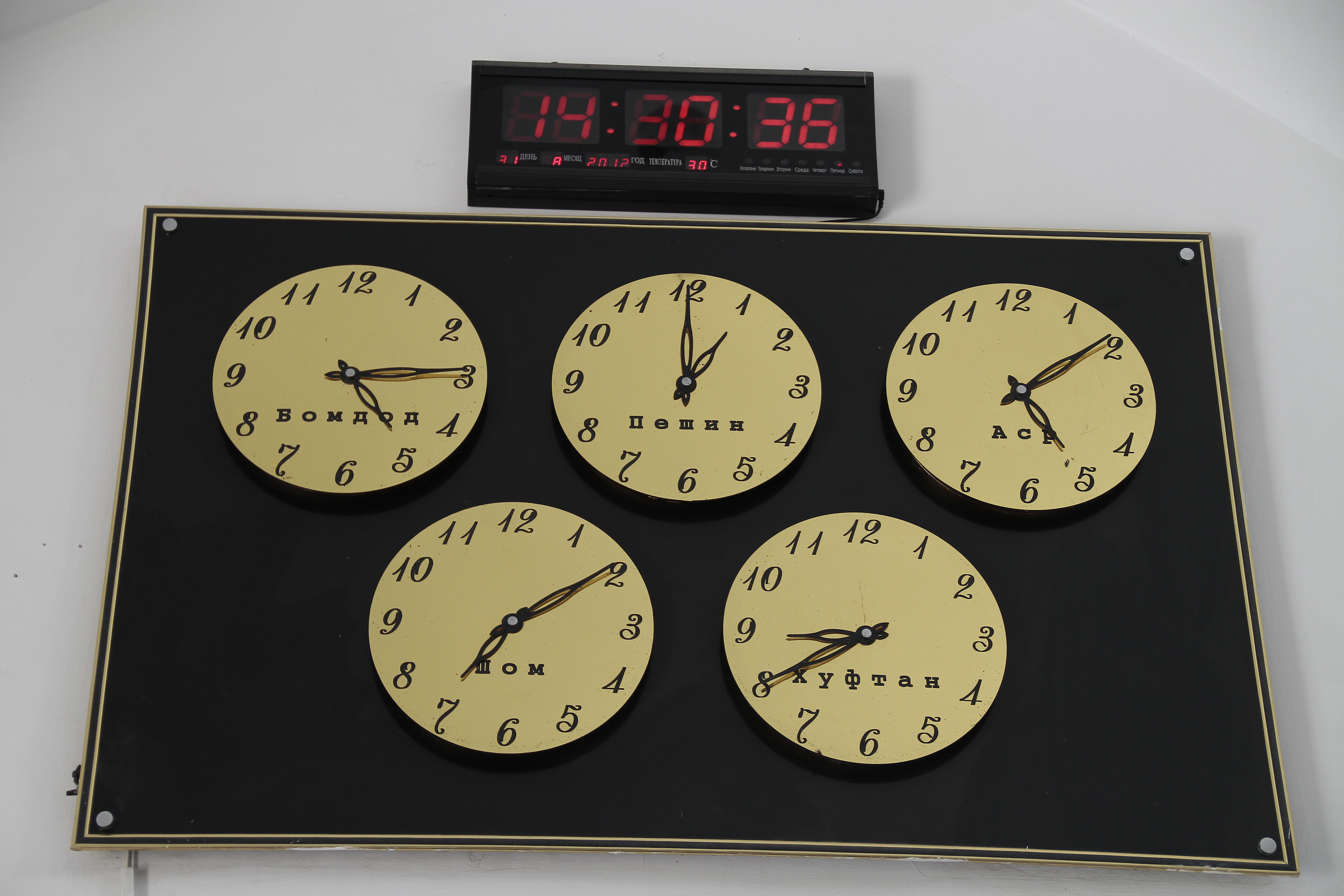
Left: A board with precalculated prayer times in a mosque. Right: An imsakiyya containing the times of prayers and imsak in an Indonesian city for Ramadan of 2012.

ʿIlm al-miqat and the activity of the muwaqqits (Turkish: muvakkitler, singular muvakkit) continued into the time of the Ottoman Empire (which conquered the Mamluks in 1517), although now they produced less scientific works compared to the zenith in the 14th and 15th centuries. Their work was overseen by the müneccimbaşı (chief imperial astrologer). The Turkish historian of science Aydın Sayılı noted that many mosques in Istanbul have buildings or rooms called muvakkithanes ("lodge of the muwaqqit"). Ottoman sultans and other notables built and patronized them as acts of piety and philanthropy. Such constructions became more common over time, peaking during the late eighteenth and the nineteenth century. Ottoman astronomers produced prayer timetables in locations previously without them, and in the eighteenth century, the architect Salih Efendi wrote timekeeping tables which were popular among the muwaqqits of the imperial capital.

As the use of mechanical clocks became common during the eighteenth century, the muwaqqits included them as part of their standard tools and many became experts at making and repairing clocks. Ottoman muwaqqits also adapted existing tables to the Ottoman convention of defining 12:00 o'clock at sunset, requiring varying amounts of time shifts each day. Setting one's personal watch according to the clocks at muvakkithanes was a common practice after the spread of personal timepieces in late eighteenth century. Activities of the muwaqqits were also recorded in Syria (especially the Umayyad Mosque) and Egypt up to the nineteenth century.

== Calculating prayer times today ==
From the nineteenth century, various religious agencies or scientific agencies approved by religious authorities began to produce annual prayer timetables. The times of prayer are included in calendars, annual almanacs, and newspapers. During the sacred month of Ramadan, tables called imsakiyya, containing times of prayer as well as that of the imsak (time to stop eating for the fast) for the whole month, are printed and distributed. In the past few decades, some mosques have installed electronic clocks capable of calculating local prayer times and sounding reminders accordingly. Today a muazzin in a mosque can broadcast the call to prayer by consulting a table or a clock without requiring the specialised skill of a muwaqqit.

== See also ==
- Dar al-Muwaqqit

== Bibliography ==
- Brentjes, Sonja (2008). "Shams al-Din al-Sakhawi on Muwaqqits, Mu'adhdhins, and the Teachers of Various Astronomical Disciplines in Mamluk Cities in the Fifteenth Century". In Emilia Calvo; Mercè Comes; Roser Puig; Mònica Rius (eds.). A Shared Legacy: Islamic Science East and West. Edicions Universitat Barcelona. ISBN 978-84-475-3285-8.
- Hadi Bashori, Muhammad (2015). Pengantar Ilmu Falak. Jakarta: Pustaka Al Kautsar. ISBN 978-979-592-701-3.
- King, David A. (1983). "The Astronomy of the Mamluks". Isis. 74 (4): 531–555. doi:10.1086/353360. JSTOR 232211. S2CID 144315162.
- King, David A. (1993). "Mīḳāt: Astronomical aspects". In Bosworth, C. E.; van Donzel, E.; Heinrichs, W. P. & Pellat, Ch. (eds.). The Encyclopaedia of Islam, Second Edition. Volume VII: Mif–Naz. Leiden: E. J. Brill. pp. 27–32. ISBN 978-90-04-09419-2.
- King, David A. (1996). "On the role of the muezzin and the muwaqqit in medieval Islamic society". In E. Jamil Ragep; Sally P. Ragep (eds.). Tradition, Transmission, Transformation. E.J. Brill. pp. 285–345. ISBN 90-04-10119-5.
- King, David A. (1998). "Mamluk astronomy and the institution of the muwaqqit". In Thomas Philipp; Ulrich Haarman (eds.). The Mamluks in Egyptian Politics and Society. Cambridge University Press. pp. 153–162. ISBN 978-0-521-59115-7.
- Pedersen, Johannes (1991). "Masdjid: The personnel of the mosque". In Bosworth, C. E.; van Donzel, E. & Pellat, Ch. (eds.). The Encyclopaedia of Islam, Second Edition. Volume VI: Mahk–Mid. Leiden: E. J. Brill. pp. 674–677. ISBN 978-90-04-08112-3.
- Wensinck, Arent Jan (1993). "Mīḳāt: Legal aspects". In Bosworth, C. E.; van Donzel, E.; Heinrichs, W. P. & Pellat, Ch. (eds.). The Encyclopaedia of Islam, Second Edition. Volume VII: Mif–Naz. Leiden: E. J. Brill. pp. 26–27. ISBN 978-90-04-09419-2.
- Wishnitzer, Avner (2015). Reading Clocks, Alla Turca: Time and Society in the Late Ottoman Empire. University of Chicago Press. ISBN 978-0-226-25772-3.
