= Triquetrum (astronomy) =

Ancient astronomical instrument

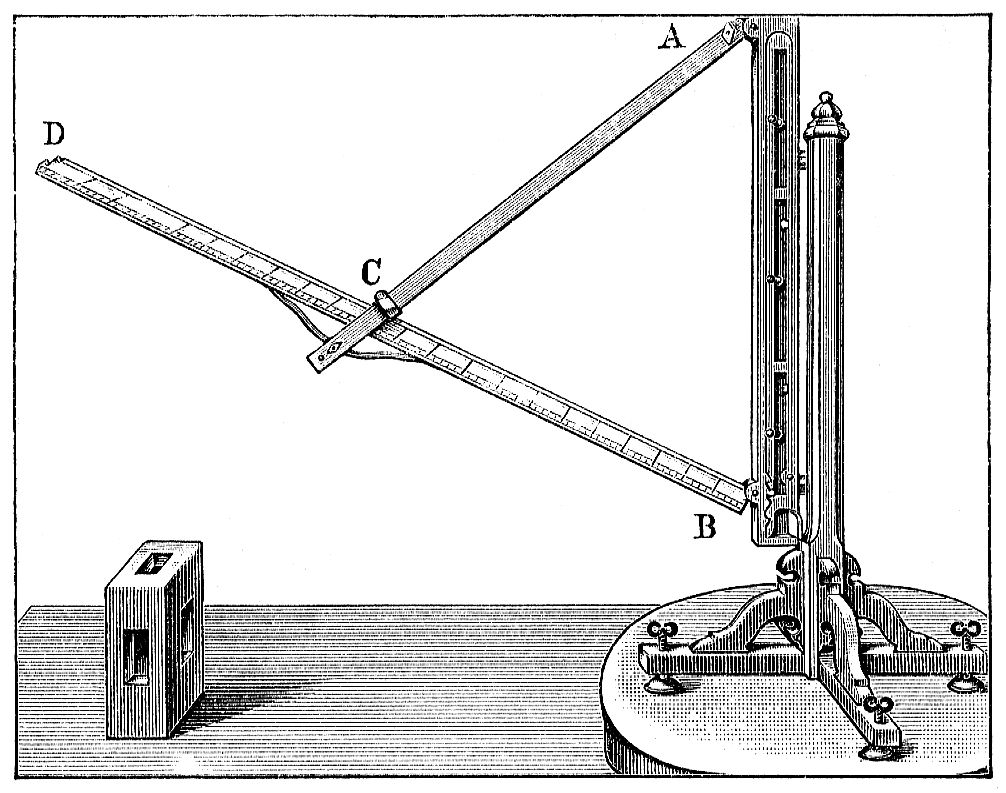
Triquetrum of Copernicus

The triquetrum (derived from the Latin tri- 'three' and quetrum 'cornered') was the medieval name for an ancient astronomical instrument first described by Ptolemy (c. 90 – c. 168) in the Almagest (V. 12). Also known as Parallactic Rulers, it was used for determining altitudes of heavenly bodies. Ptolemy calls it a "parallactic instrument" and seems to have used it to determine the zenith distance and parallax of the Moon.

== Design ==
The triquetrum performed the same function as the quadrant and was devised to overcome the difficulty of graduating arcs and circles. It consisted of a vertical post with a graduated scale and two pivoted arms hinged at the top and bottom, the upper arm carrying sights. The two arms were joined so that their ends could slide. As a person sighted along the upper arm, the lower one changed its angle. By reading the position of the lower rod, in combination with the vertical length, the zenith distance (or, alternatively, the altitude) of a celestial object could be calculated.

== Use ==
The triquetrum was one of the most popular astronomical instruments until the invention of the telescope, it could measure angles with a better precision than the astrolabe. Copernicus describes its use in the fourth book of the De revolutionibus orbium coelestium (1543) under the heading "Instrumenti parallactici constructio." The instrument was also used by Tycho Brahe in the same century.

== See also ==
- List of astronomical instruments
