= Optical Institute at Benediktbeuern =

Bavarian optical-glass and scientific-instrument enterprise

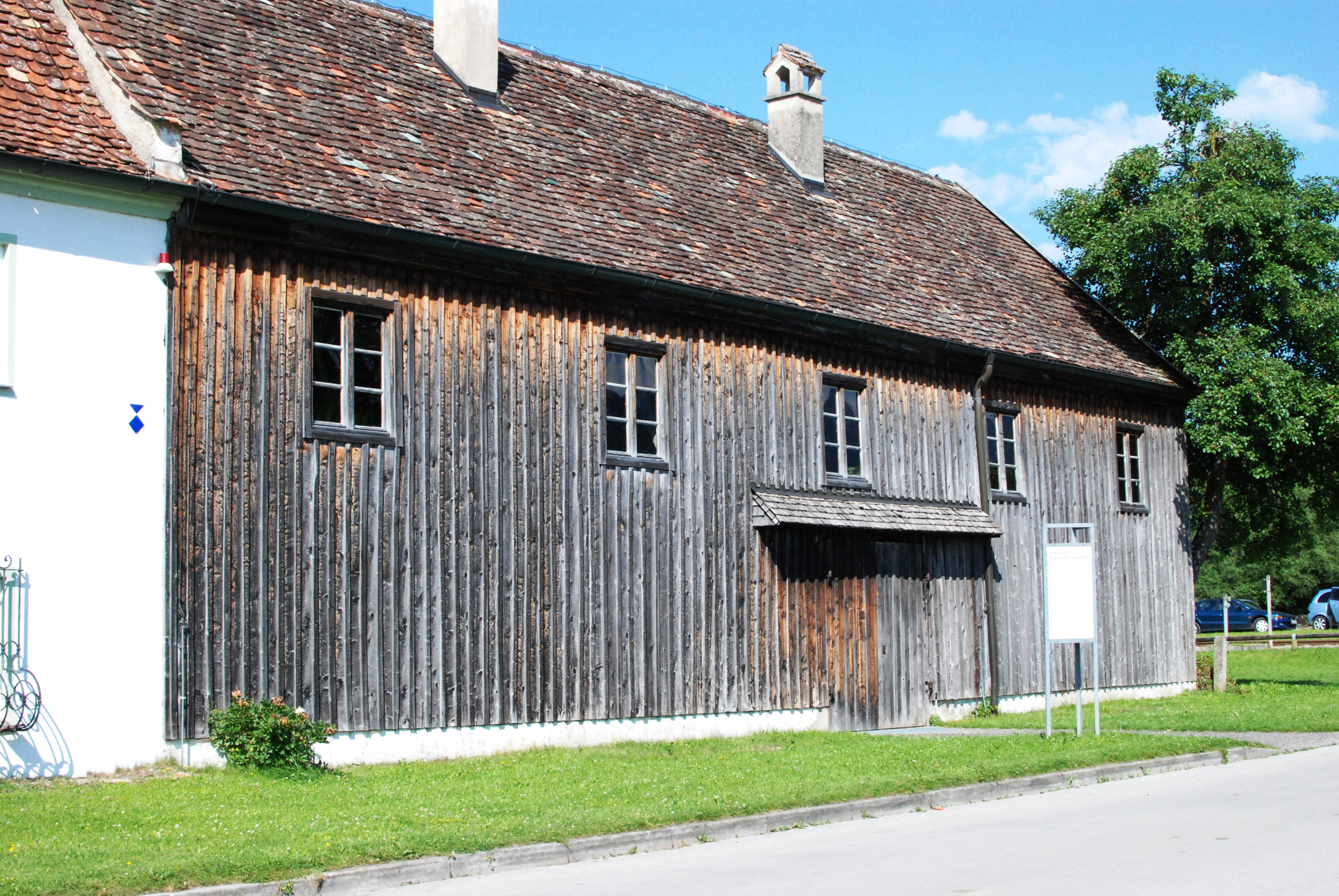
The former glassworks building at Benediktbeuern, which now contains an exhibition of its furnaces, tools and optical instruments

The Optical Institute at Benediktbeuern (or also the Utzschneider Optical Institute) was a Bavarian business that made optical glass, lenses and scientific instruments. Joseph von Utzschneider established glassmaking and optical workshops in the buildings of the secularised Benediktbeuern Abbey from 1805. Joseph von Fraunhofer later developed a complete production system that covered glass selection, lens shaping, calculation, assembly and testing. Its main products included achromatic objectives, the large front lenses of telescopes, designed to reduce coloured blur. The works became contractually independent of the Munich Mathematical-Mechanical Institute in 1809. By making optical glass and working it into precise lenses, the institute supplied astronomical and surveying instruments across Europe. (Note: The works developed in stages. Utzschneider obtained possession of buildings at Benediktbeuern in 1805, the deed was completed in 1807, and the Optical Institute became contractually independent on 7 February 1809. Sources therefore use different dates depending on the event meant by the institute's “foundation”.)

Utzschneider wanted a reliable local supply of optical glass instead of depending on scarce and uneven imports. He recruited the Swiss glassmaker Pierre-Louis Guinand, while Fraunhofer reorganised glass selection, lens grinding and polishing, optical calculation and final testing. The Optical Institute and the later Munich mechanical workshops remained separate organisations but exchanged telescope objectives, mountings and other components. In 1819 most lens working and instrument assembly moved to Munich, though glass continued to be melted at Benediktbeuern, where Fraunhofer supervised individual batches. A major instrument completed during his lifetime was the large refractor delivered to Dorpat Observatory in 1824.

After Fraunhofer's death in 1826, Georg Merz directed the optical work and Franz Joseph Mahler directed the mechanical department. They bought shares from Utzschneider in 1838 and acquired the whole enterprise in 1839, trading as Merz and Mahler. Georg Merz later continued the business with his sons, and Sigmund Merz became sole owner in 1867. Relatives divided the Munich workshop from the Benediktbeuern glassworks in 1882 and 1883, and glassmaking ended during the following years. Jakob Merz sold the Munich business to Paul Zschokke in 1903, and it later moved to Pasing and became G. & S. Merz GmbH, a limited liability company. The company entered liquidation in 1932 and was removed from the commercial register in 1938. (Note: The later workshops used several names, including Merz & Mahler, G. Merz & Sohn, G. Merz & Söhne and G. & S. Merz. The reuse of the Utzschneider and Fraunhofer names did not make all these partnerships and successor businesses one uninterrupted legal company.)

== History ==
=== Origins and establishment ===
Joseph von Utzschneider entered precision-instrument manufacture as the financial and commercial partner of Georg Friedrich von Reichenbach and Joseph Liebherr. Their agreement of 20 August 1804 created the Mathematical-Mechanical Institute in Munich. It made surveying and astronomical instruments. Reichenbach designed instruments and carried out the most demanding mechanical work, Liebherr supervised production, and Utzschneider supplied money and managed the business. The workshop needed high-quality optical parts, but suitable flint glass was difficult to obtain during the Napoleonic Wars and usually had to be imported from a few English makers.

Utzschneider and the optician Josef Niggl attempted experimental optical-glass melts-individual batches of molten glass-at the Ettal glassworks near present-day Grafenaschau around 1804. The results were insufficient for regular production. Utzschneider therefore sought a specialist who could make even, flaw-free flint glass in pieces large enough for telescope objectives. He found Pierre-Louis Guinand, a self-taught Swiss glassmaker who had developed ways to stir molten glass more evenly and had made small achromatic telescopes. After negotiations in 1805, Guinand and members of his family moved to Benediktbeuern.

Utzschneider offered to buy the former monastery complex on 3 May 1805 and received possession on 6 July, although the legal transfer was not completed until 23 October 1807. The large buildings, available water power, fuel and distance from crowded areas made the site suitable for furnaces and workshops. Guinand reported from Benediktbeuern in October 1805. Samples from the first recorded trials in crown and flint glass were sent to Munich in January 1806. Under a contract dated 10 May 1806, Guinand was responsible for making optical and coloured glass and for work on achromatic telescopes.

Joseph von Fraunhofer entered the Munich enterprise in 1806 and was assigned to optical work at Benediktbeuern in 1807. By 1808 he was living there continuously. He began as a lens grinder and Guinand's assistant, but soon took responsibility for calculations, workshop equipment and checking the glass for defects. The move of optical work from Munich happened gradually: sales and stored goods remained in the capital, while glass melting, lens grinding and instrument work were developed at Benediktbeuern.

=== Separation and Fraunhofer's direction ===
In January 1809 Fraunhofer proposed a reorganisation. He would supervise the Optical Institute, calculate and test its optical systems and personally carry out the most difficult lens work. On 7 February Utzschneider, Reichenbach and Fraunhofer signed an agreement for an Optical Institute at Benediktbeuern. Utzschneider kept ownership of the buildings, machinery and other capital, while Fraunhofer directed production and staff training. The partners divided the profits according to the contract. A second agreement on the same day formally separated the optical operation from the Mathematical-Mechanical Institute. The Munich institute transferred machinery used for optical work, while the two businesses agreed to continue supplying each other with objectives and mechanical equipment.

The agreement made official a division that already existed in practice. The Optical Institute made lenses and complete optical instruments, while the Munich workshop concentrated on precision mechanics and precisely graduated measuring circles. Fraunhofer organised production as a clear sequence. Workers examined the cooled glass, selected usable pieces, shaped them into rough lens blanks, ground and polished them, calculated the required curves, aligned the lenses around their optical axis, assembled them and tested the completed instrument. Guinand still had specialist knowledge of the furnaces and raw glass, but Fraunhofer increasingly controlled overall production. (Note: Fraunhofer directed optical processing by 1808–1809 and assumed direct responsibility for glass melting in 1811. Later summaries sometimes compress these changes into a single date.)

Fraunhofer took charge of glass melting in 1811. Between then and 1825 the glasshouse recorded 95 separate melts, using different furnaces for crown and flint glass. Guinand left in 1814 after disputes within the works and returned to the region of Neuchâtel. In the same year Reichenbach and Utzschneider ended their partnership. Reichenbach received the Munich Mathematical-Mechanical Institute, which continued with Traugott Leberecht Ertel, while Utzschneider received Reichenbach's share of the Optical Institute. Fraunhofer became Utzschneider's partner, and their instruments were signed “Utzschneider & Fraunhofer in Benedictbeuern”.

The formal separation did not end cooperation between the workshops. Utzschneider formed another mechanical workshop in Munich with Joseph Liebherr and Carl Friederich Werner in 1814. (Note: Werner's forenames remain uncertain. While later records give such initials as “C. I.” and “C. L.”, Teichmann's 2025 review of Rolf Riekher's documentary edition calls the writer of a 23 August 1816 letter to Fraunhofer Carl Friedrich Werner, but does not explain the other initials.) Both this business and the Reichenbach and Ertel workshop continued to buy optical parts from Benediktbeuern. Separate price lists issued in 1816 advertised mechanical instruments from the Munich workshop and optical instruments from the Benediktbeuern institute. The glassworks therefore supplied both complete instruments made under Utzschneider and Fraunhofer and parts for other, legally separate businesses.

=== Move to Munich and succession ===
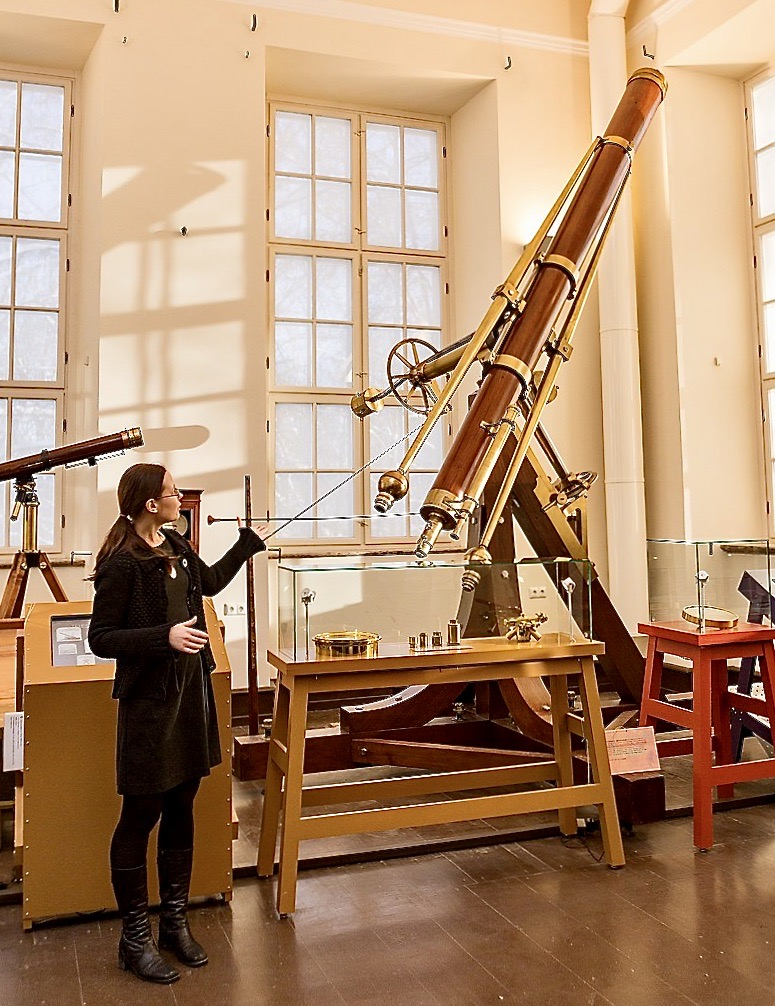
The Fraunhofer refractor delivered to Dorpat Observatory in 1824 and preserved at the University of Tartu Old Observatory

Financial difficulties forced Utzschneider to give up ownership of most of the former monastery property in 1818, although the institute kept the rooms and buildings it needed. In 1819 lens grinding, polishing and instrument assembly moved to Munich. This placed the optical workshop closer to customers, suppliers and mechanical instrument makers, but it did not close the Benediktbeuern glasshouse. Glass continued to be melted there, and Fraunhofer travelled from Munich to supervise new batches and choose the usable pieces.

In Munich, Fraunhofer combined manufacturing with experiments designed to make optical properties measurable and repeatable. He measured the refractive index, how strongly glass bends light, and the dispersion, how strongly it separates colours, of different glasses. He then used measured lines in the visible spectrum as fixed reference points when calculating achromatic lenses. His study of the dark lines in the solar spectrum was therefore directly connected with workshop practice. The lines marked precise wavelengths at which different glasses and completed objectives could be compared.

A major instrument completed during Fraunhofer's lifetime was the refractor ordered by Friedrich Georg Wilhelm von Struve for Dorpat Observatory. Delivered in 1824, it had a nine-Paris-inch objective, about 24.4 centimetres across, an equatorial mount that could follow the sky's rotation and clock-driven tracking. The instrument combined the institute's glassmaking, optical calculation, lens work and precision mechanics and is preserved at the University of Tartu Old Observatory.

Fraunhofer died on 7 June 1826. Utzschneider wanted the institute to continue as an independent workshop. On 17 July he appointed Georg Merz as first optician on a salary of 1,200 guilders. Merz had worked in the enterprise since the Benediktbeuern period and now supervised optical production and the quality of completed instruments. Franz Joseph Mahler, an instrument maker, directed the mechanical workshop. At first, access to Fraunhofer's papers and tools was restricted. His successors therefore had to keep production running while rebuilding parts of his working method from surviving equipment, unfinished orders and their own experience.

=== Merz and Mahler ===
Merz and Mahler kept the division of work established under Fraunhofer. Merz was responsible for the glasshouse, telescope objectives and optical calculations, while Mahler supervised mountings and other mechanical work. Their first major challenge was the heliometer ordered by Friedrich Bessel for Königsberg Observatory. A heliometer measures very small angles by moving two halves of a divided objective until two images line up. Fraunhofer had designed the instrument and prepared its objective, Merz divided and finished the lens, and Mahler directed construction of the mounting. The instrument reached Königsberg on 11 March 1829. Bessel later used it to measure the stellar parallax of 61 Cygni, the star's apparent shift against more distant stars, from which its distance could be estimated.

Utzschneider remained the owner and commercial head during the first twelve years of their management. On 17 March 1838, while heavily indebted and preparing to withdraw, he sold equal shares to Merz and Mahler. Together, these shares represented half the value of the institute. Utzschneider kept the other half and remained its chief. The contract gave Merz sole management of the optical department, including glass melting and lens working, and gave Mahler sole management of the mechanical workshops. Merz kept the accounts under Mahler's supervision.

A second contract, dated 20 January 1839, transferred the rest of the enterprise to Merz and Mahler. The sale included the Munich workshops and stored goods, as well as the furnaces, equipment and glass reserves at Benediktbeuern. The partners then traded as Merz and Mahler, although they continued to use the names of Utzschneider and Fraunhofer in some signatures and publicity. Ownership therefore changed in two stages, not through a single sale in either 1838 or 1839.

A major early commission was for the new Pulkovo Observatory near Saint Petersburg. The instruments delivered in 1839 included a refractor with an objective about 38 centimetres across and a seven-inch heliometer. The commission required large matching lens pairs, substantial equatorial mountings and several additional instruments made under the joint direction of Merz and Mahler.

=== Later Merz business and glassworks ===
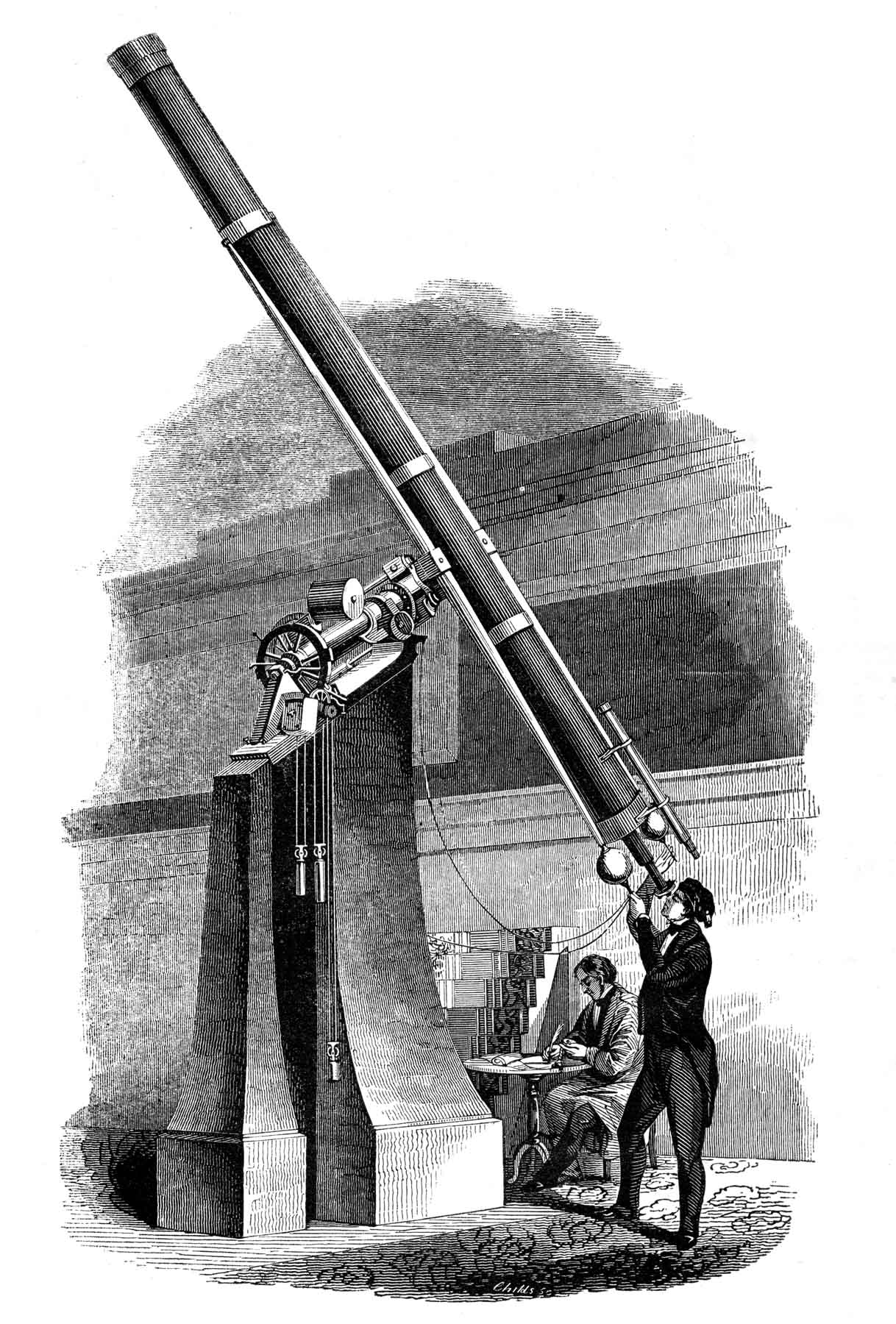
An 1848 engraving of the 11-inch Merz and Mahler refractor at Cincinnati Observatory, first used there in 1845

Mahler died on 21 June 1845. An agreement with his heirs, confirmed by the Munich court on 8 May 1846, made Georg Merz the sole owner. His son Sigmund had joined the workshop in 1842, and the business used the name G. Merz & Sohn. Sigmund and his brother Ludwig Merz became co-owners in 1847, when the name changed to G. Merz & Söhne. Ludwig died in 1858, and from 1861 the firm was known as G. & S. Merz.

The workshop kept separate optical and mechanical departments while expanding its range. It sold large refractors, heliometers and objectives, but also smaller telescopes, microscopes, hand telescopes, opera glasses, spectacles, magnifying glasses and replacement objectives. Jürgen Kost's dissertation of its account books found that simpler goods produced about half of its monthly turnover, while large astronomical instruments were generally sold only once or twice a year. The firm nevertheless made about 90 large refractors and 100 large astronomical objectives and supplied optical parts to at least 30 other workshops.

The 11-inch refractor supplied to Cincinnati Observatory was first used on 14 April 1845 and remains in use for public programmes. Georg Merz died on 12 January 1867, and Sigmund became sole owner. Under him the firm continued to supply refractors and objectives, although competition increased as other makers developed improved optical glass, photographic lenses and new binocular and laboratory instruments.

On 25 February 1882 Sigmund transferred the equipment of the Munich optical workshop to his relatives Matthias and Jakob Merz by deed of gift, while keeping several important machines and the Benediktbeuern glassmaking property. After Matthias's death, an amendment dated 21 June 1883 made Jakob the sole owner of the Munich workshop when the change was registered on 1 July. The transaction separated instrument making in Munich from the glasshouse, which Sigmund retained under the name G. & S. Merz.

The last documented glass melts took place in 1885, although one later account placed the end of production around 1887 and Sigmund issued a formal closure notice on 30 September 1889. Jakob continued the Munich workshop as a family business, making mainly smaller telescopes and practical optical goods. Without an operating glasshouse, it increasingly depended on stored glass or outside suppliers. (Note: The differing dates describe different endpoints. The business was divided in 1883, the last documented melts occurred in 1885, Weber gave an approximate date of 1887, and Sigmund Merz's formal closure notice was dated 30 September 1889.)

=== Zschokke, Pasing and closure ===
Jakob Merz sold the business to Paul Zschokke in the spring of 1903. Zschokke traded as the Optisches Institut G. & S. Merz vormals Utzschneider und Fraunhofer in München, keeping the historic names as part of the business identity. He concentrated more heavily on smaller refractors, objectives and telescopes for amateurs and schools.

The workshop moved from central Munich to Pasing, where the new premises opened on 1 April 1907. By 1912 the business had become G. & S. Merz GmbH, with Zschokke as managing director. It continued to make optical instruments and also sold some products made by other manufacturers under the Merz name. Around 1910 it introduced a lower-priced school telescope, followed in 1911 by a specialised medial telescope, a type of catadioptric system combining lenses and a mirror.

Zschokke died in 1932, when the company was heavily indebted. G. & S. Merz GmbH entered liquidation that year. Its machines and stock were dispersed or sold. Former employees briefly continued to make some small telescope models, but these were new workshops rather than a continuation of the company. The company was removed from the commercial register in June 1938 after its insolvency proceedings had not been completed by the manager.

== Organisation and manufacturing ==
The institute did not operate as a single factory at one site. During the Benediktbeuern period it included a glasshouse, rooms for working lenses and spaces for assembling instruments, while sales and some mechanical work remained in Munich. The 1809 contracts made the Optical Institute legally and financially separate from the Mathematical-Mechanical Institute, but the two businesses continued to exchange parts. After 1814 several competing mechanical workshops in Munich bought optics from Benediktbeuern. From 1819 the normal process began with glass melting and selection at Benediktbeuern and continued with lens working, testing and instrument assembly in Munich.

The glasshouse used separate furnaces for crown glass and flint glass. Workers melted the raw materials in clay pots and stirred the liquid glass to make its composition more even. After the glass cooled slowly, they broke open the pots. Pieces containing bubbles, coloured areas, streaks known as striae or other defects were rejected. Usable fragments could be reheated and pressed or softened into rough lens blanks, a workshop process called ramollieren. The blanks were then ground to calculated curves, polished and centred so that their surfaces shared the same optical axis. Large flawless pieces were rare, so an objective could not be completed until the workshop had a suitable matching pair of crown and flint glass.

The management structure followed these manufacturing stages. Under Fraunhofer, responsibility extended from selecting glass to calculating lenses and testing finished instruments. The specialised glassworkers and lens grinders carried out the individual operations under his direction. After 1826 Merz supervised the optical department and glasshouse, while Mahler controlled the mechanical department. Their 1838 partnership contract formally preserved this division. Later family partnerships changed the owners and business names, but glassmaking, optical processing and mechanical construction remained separate kinds of work until the glasshouse closed.

== Optical glass and instruments ==
An achromatic objective uses two kinds of glass to reduce unwanted colour around an image. Crown glass bends the different colours of light by relatively similar amounts, while lead-rich flint glass separates them more strongly. An optician combines a positive crown lens with a negative flint lens so that two parts of the visible spectrum come to nearly the same focus. This greatly reduces the coloured fringes seen in early refracting telescopes. The final result depended on both the shape of the lenses and the measured refractive index and dispersion of the glass from each melt.

Fraunhofer made these measurements part of normal production. He cut test prisms from the glass and measured their refraction and dispersion before recording the figures used to calculate objectives. The fixed dark lines in the solar spectrum gave him repeatable reference wavelengths. This allowed different glass samples and completed instruments to be compared more precisely than by using broad colour descriptions alone. Spectroscopic research at the institute was therefore both scientific work and a practical method of making optical production more consistent.

The institute's catalogues offered achromatic telescopes, microscopes, terrestrial telescopes, opera glasses and optical components. Large observatory instruments were less common and normally made for a specific order. The Dorpat refractor combined a large objective with a stable equatorial mounting and clock drive. The Königsberg heliometer used a divided objective for precise angle measurements, while the Pulkovo commission combined several large instruments in one observatory order.

Later Merz instruments continued to combine optical and mechanical specialisation. The firm supplied complete refractors but also sold objectives separately to observatories and other instrument makers. For this reason, a maker's name on a lens, telescope tube or mounting does not always identify the maker of the complete instrument. Jackson describes Fraunhofer's spectral measurements as part of a system of optical standardisation, while Kost's study shows that the successor workshops remained important suppliers of instruments and optical components after 1826.

== Surviving buildings, instruments and archives ==
The Benediktbeuern glassworks building survives within the former monastery complex. Its exhibition includes two melting furnaces with stirring mechanisms, workshop tools and optical objects connected with the production process. The site represents the glassmaking part of the enterprise that remained at Benediktbeuern after 1819. It is therefore different from reconstructions or museum collections of Fraunhofer's later workshop in Munich.

Surviving instruments are held by several observatories and museums. The 1824 refractor remains at the University of Tartu Old Observatory, while the Deutsches Museum, Cincinnati Observatory and other collections preserve telescopes, microscopes and objects associated with the different Merz partnerships. These signatures help trace changes in the business name, but they do not always show who made every optical and mechanical part of an instrument.

The Deutsches Museum Archive holds Utzschneider's papers about the Optical Institute and glassworks. They include calculations for crown- and flint-glass melts, stock records and documents prepared after Fraunhofer's death. Its G. & S. Merz business archive contains correspondence, accounts, catalogues, drawings and glass-melt records from Benediktbeuern, including records from the 1840s. These collections show how the workshops operated and how ownership changed information that cannot always be recovered from the surviving instruments themselves.

== Sources ==
- Cincinnati Observatory (13 April 2025). "Mitchel Telescope First Light Open House". Cincinnati Observatory.
- Deutsches Museum (2023). "NL 015: Utzschneider, Joseph von" (PDF). Deutsches Museum Archive (in German).
- Deutsches Museum (2023). "FA 015: G. & S. Merz" (PDF). Deutsches Museum Archive (in German).
- Deutsches Museum. "Successors". Deutsches Museum.
- Jackson, Myles W. (1996). "Buying the Dark Lines of the Solar Spectrum: Joseph von Fraunhofer's Standard for the Manufacture of Optical Glass". In Buchwald, Jed Z. (ed.). Scientific Credibility and Technical Standards in 19th and Early 20th Century Germany and Britain. Archimedes. Vol. 1. Dordrecht: Kluwer Academic Publishers. pp. 1–22. doi:10.1007/978-94-009-1784-2_1.
- Kirmeier, Josef (2008). "Research and production: Glassworks and Optical Institute in Benediktbeuern". Fraunhofer in Benediktbeuern: Glassworks and Workshop (PDF). Munich: Fraunhofer-Gesellschaft. pp. 18–31.
- Kost, Jürgen (2014). Wissenschaftlicher Instrumentenbau der Firma Merz in München (1838–1932) (PhD thesis) (in German). University of Hamburg.
- Mewes, Christoph (2008). "The exhibition: Glassworks and workshop". Fraunhofer in Benediktbeuern: Glassworks and Workshop (PDF). Munich: Fraunhofer-Gesellschaft. pp. 40–43.
- Schneider, Ivo (2014). Joseph von Utzschneider: Vision und Wirklichkeit eines neuen Bayern. Beiträge zur Geschichte der Bayerischen Akademie der Wissenschaften (in German). Vol. 3. Regensburg: Friedrich Pustet. ISBN 978-3-7917-2630-4.
- Teichmann, Jürgen (2025). "Instrument making in 19th-century Munich". Journal for the History of Astronomy. 56 (3): 373–375. doi:10.1177/00218286251331944.
- University of Tartu (2024). "Exhibition "Two Boys who Dreamed of Stars. Struve, Fraunhofer and the 200-Year-Old Telescope"". University of Tartu Museum.
- UNESCO Portal to the Heritage of Astronomy. "Pulkovo Observatory". UNESCO Portal to the Heritage of Astronomy.
- Weber, Leo (2008). "Joseph von Utzschneider and Joseph von Fraunhofer at the former Benedictine monastery of Benediktbeuern, 1805–1818". Fraunhofer in Benediktbeuern: Glassworks and Workshop (PDF). Munich: Fraunhofer-Gesellschaft. pp. 32–39.
- Willach, Rolf (2004). "The Heliometer: Instrument for Gauging Distances in Space". Journal of the Antique Telescope Society (26).
