= Mathematical-Mechanical Institute =

Munich maker of surveying, astronomical and optical instruments

The Mathematical-Mechanical Institute (German: Mathematisch-mechanisches Institut; later also Mathematisch-Feinmechanisches Institut) was a Munich workshop for scientific instruments, established in 1802 by the engineer Georg Friedrich von Reichenbach and the mechanic Joseph Liebherr. Joseph von Utzschneider joined them in 1804 as financier and commercial director. The institute produced instruments for geodesy, surveying and astronomy; its workshops brought together precise metalworking, circle graduation, optical glass and achromatic lens manufacture.

The workshop grew out of the needs of the Bavarian state survey. Reichenbach and Liebherr built dividing engines and compact instruments for field and observatory work. Utzschneider later established glassmaking and optical production at the secularised Benediktbeuern Abbey, where Joseph von Fraunhofer developed optical glass, lens-making and methods of testing finished optics. The Optical Institute at Benediktbeuern was separated contractually from the Munich mechanical workshop in 1809, but each continued to supply the other. Their products included theodolites, repeating circles, meridian circles, transit instruments, heliometers and large refracting telescopes.

The original partnership ended in stages: Liebherr withdrew in 1812, and Reichenbach and Utzschneider separated in 1814. Reichenbach continued the mechanical workshop with Traugott Ertel and transferred it to Ertel in 1821. Utzschneider retained the optical works with Fraunhofer and opened a competing Munich workshop with Liebherr and Werner. After Fraunhofer's death, Georg Merz and Franz Joseph Mahler directed the optical and mechanical departments and acquired the business in two stages, in 1838 and 1839. The Ertel line continued under later owners until 1984. The Merz company stopped production in 1932 and was deleted from the commercial register in 1938. (Note: The English title is descriptive. Period records used several German names, and later businesses generally traded under their proprietors' names. Because the partnerships were dissolved, divided and transferred, the Ertel and Merz concerns are treated here as related successor businesses rather than as one uninterrupted legal company.)

== History ==
=== Foundation and early workshop ===
The Bavarian Topographical Bureau provided the workshop's first institutional setting. Created during the French occupation to prepare a military-topographical map, it was retained by the Bavarian government after the French withdrawal. The bureau lacked suitable field instruments. Joseph von Utzschneider, who was assigned to it and advocated a wider cadastral survey, saw a continuing state market for accurate angular-measuring instruments.

Georg Friedrich von Reichenbach had studied English engineering and instrument workshops during a government-supported journey in the 1790s. After returning to Bavaria, he devised a machine for graduating circular scales. In late 1801 or 1802 he joined Joseph Liebherr, a clockmaker and mechanic who had established himself in Munich, to turn the design into a working machine and to manufacture instruments. The Benedictine astronomer and surveyor Ulrich Schiegg advised the two men, tested their instruments and introduced their work to Utzschneider. In May 1802 the Bavarian Academy of Sciences advanced 600 guilders towards a mathematical workshop, although the money was later recalled after a dispute over the quality assessment.

The first dividing engine came from their collaboration. Reichenbach devised its geometrical principle and specified the graduation work; Liebherr built the mechanism, drawing on a gear-cutting machine that he had made in 1794. Both men later claimed priority. Reviewing the dispute in his 2014 scholarly biography of Utzschneider, the historian of mathematics and science Ivo Schneider found no basis for assigning the invention exclusively to either man. Utzschneider later called it the “Reichenbach–Liebherr” dividing machine.

By early 1804 the workshop had completed a 16-inch terrestrial circle, a portable meridian instrument and an 18-inch astronomical circle. The terrestrial circle measured horizontal and vertical field angles and could be read to a few seconds of arc. On the astronomical circle an observer could repeat the same angle several times before reading the scale, reducing some reading error. Schiegg tested the instruments while determining the latitude of Munich, and Franz Xaver von Zach reported the results in his Monatliche Correspondenz.

=== Utzschneider partnership ===
On 20 August 1804 Reichenbach, Liebherr and Utzschneider signed a partnership contract for a workshop producing mathematical and mechanical instruments in Munich. The agreement assigned Reichenbach 40 per cent of the profits and responsibility for scientific and technical design, including centring and graduation where the greatest precision was required. Liebherr, with a 30-per-cent share, was the first master of the workshop and supervised the journeymen according to Reichenbach's instructions. Utzschneider also received 30 per cent; he supplied capital and premises, bought materials, kept the accounts and handled commercial management. Decisions about the product range and prices required all three partners. Utzschneider undertook to pay monthly advances of 90 guilders to Reichenbach and 70 to Liebherr.

The new capital allowed the work to be divided more closely. In October 1805 Schiegg reported a staff of seven, further recruitment and orders from the observatories at Ofen (Buda) and Riga. The Bavarian survey remained an important customer, while correspondence, reports and price lists brought orders from outside the kingdom. Reichenbach designed the instruments and performed the most exact operations; Utzschneider managed finance and sales; Liebherr directed the craftsmen.

The dividing engine made it possible to mark finely spaced, nearly uniform angular scales on brass or silver-inlaid circles. This reduced dependence on laborious hand division and allowed the workshop to make families of instruments in several sizes. Reichenbach simplified the frames and axes of field instruments to make them lighter without abandoning rigid construction. His designs included repeating theodolites, universal instruments, levels, plane-table equipment and distance-measuring devices, as well as astronomical circles and transit instruments.

=== Optical production at Benediktbeuern ===
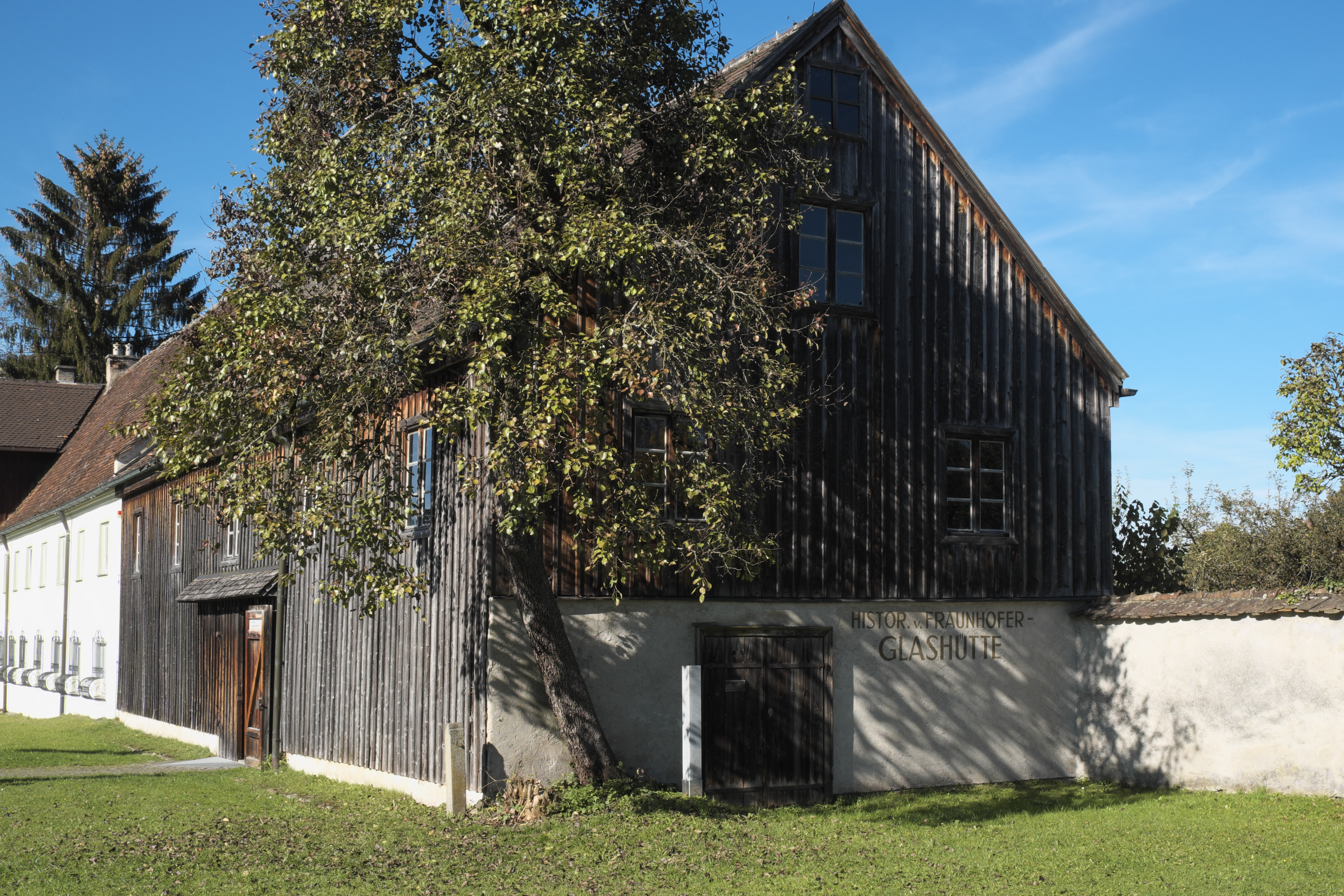
The surviving glassworks building at Benediktbeuern. Optical processing was transferred to Munich in 1819, but glass continued to be melted at Benediktbeuern.

The mechanical workshop depended on imported optical glass for telescope objectives, eyepieces and reading microscopes. Ordinary glass contained striae, bubbles and variations in refractive index that impaired large lenses, while the disruption of trade during the Napoleonic Wars made reliable supplies still more difficult. Utzschneider first supported experimental melts at Ettal and then acquired the secularised Benediktbeuern monastery complex in 1805, where he established consumer-glass and optical-glass production.

The Swiss glassmaker Pierre-Louis Guinand was recruited to Benediktbeuern. His stirring method helped to homogenise the molten glass, although useful material still had to be selected from imperfect pots and cooled slowly to reduce internal strain. In 1807 the glassworks was incorporated into the wider enterprise so that its optical glass would serve the instrument workshops.

Fraunhofer joined the Munich institute as an optician in 1806 after Schiegg examined his abilities. He moved to Benediktbeuern in 1807 or 1808 and gradually assumed responsibility for grinding, polishing and assembling lenses. By 1809 he supervised all downstream optical work apart from melting; in 1811 he also took charge of the glassmaking operation and became a partner in the Optical Institute.

A contract of 7 February 1809 separated the Optical Institute at Benediktbeuern from the Mathematical-Mechanical Institute in Munich. The workshops nevertheless continued to exchange components. Benediktbeuern supplied objectives, eyepieces, prisms and other optical parts; the Munich makers supplied mounts and mechanisms. Fraunhofer also developed complete optical instruments at Benediktbeuern.

Fraunhofer regularised the work from glass selection to the testing of finished lenses. He measured refractive and dispersive properties and calculated combinations of crown glass and flint glass. The resulting achromatic objectives reduced the coloured fringes of earlier refractors. Gauges and standard tools also made grinding and assembly more consistent.

=== Separation and competing institutes ===
The partners disagreed over the cost and location of the optical works and over claims to the dividing engine. Utzschneider had invested heavily in Benediktbeuern; Reichenbach and Liebherr objected to the expense and to the transfer of work from Munich. Liebherr withdrew on 5 September 1812, when the three-man partnership was dissolved and his share was settled. He received a small dividing machine, two lathes, an astronomical pendulum clock, an astrolabe, three vices and other equipment. He could make most kinds of instruments independently but was initially restricted from producing dividing engines and astronomical circles above two feet in diameter; the remaining partners agreed to refer some smaller orders to him, and he remained bound to protect workshop secrets.

Reichenbach and Utzschneider continued together only briefly. Accounts and correspondence show negotiations through 1813, followed by a contract of 7 February 1814 dissolving their mutual agreements for both the Munich and Benediktbeuern institutes. Reichenbach received the Munich mechanical workshop; Utzschneider retained Reichenbach's interest in the optical enterprise.

Reichenbach continued with Ertel, an instrument maker who had joined the workshop in 1806 and became a partner in August 1815. Utzschneider rebuilt a mechanical workshop in Munich with Liebherr and a partner named Werner. The firm advertised as Utzschneider, Liebherr et Werner and offered angular-measuring and astronomical mechanisms for use with Benediktbeuern optics. (Note: Werner's forenames remain uncertain. While later records give such initials as “C. I.” and “C. L.”, Teichmann's 2025 review of Rolf Riekher's documentary edition calls the writer of a 23 August 1816 letter to Fraunhofer Carl Friedrich Werner, but does not explain the other initials. The article therefore uses only the surname in the main text.)

Two price lists printed consecutively in 1816 show how the arrangement worked. The first offered instruments from the Munich mechanical workshop of Utzschneider, Liebherr and Werner; the second offered products of the Optical Institute of Utzschneider and Fraunhofer at Benediktbeuern. Reichenbach and Ertel, although competitors of the Munich workshop, also bought optical components from Benediktbeuern.

In 1818 Utzschneider transferred most of the Benediktbeuern estate to the Bavarian state while retaining or leasing the glassmaking facilities needed by the Optical Institute. Optical grinding, assembly and instrument construction moved to Munich in 1819, while glass continued to be melted at Benediktbeuern. The Munich premises thereafter contained both mechanical and optical workshops.

=== Reichenbach and Ertel ===
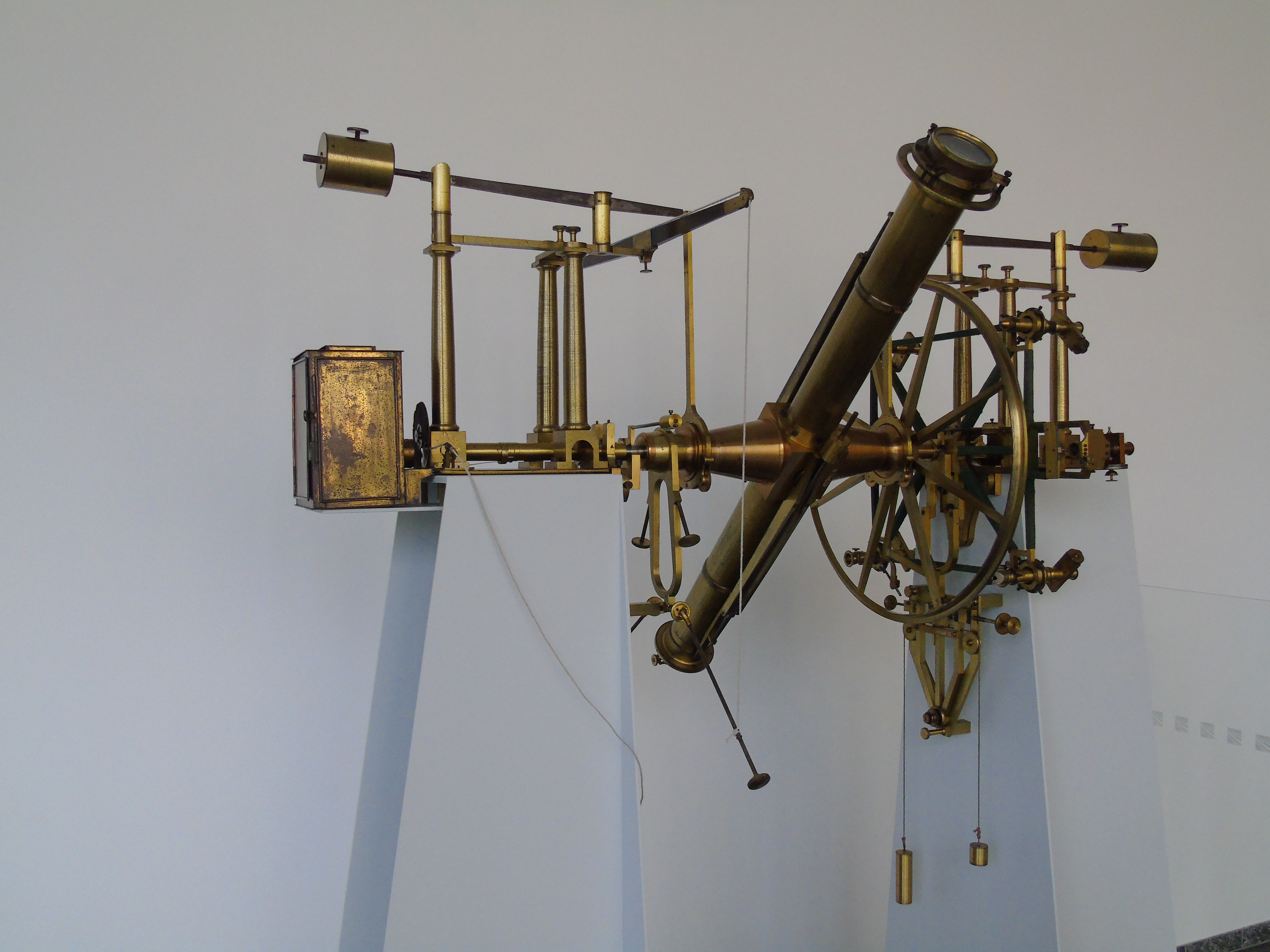
A meridian circle made by Reichenbach and Ertel in Munich in 1825 for Gotha Observatory.

Reichenbach's attention increasingly shifted from instrument making to state engineering. He designed machinery for the Bavarian saltworks and a brine pipeline across difficult terrain, and in 1820 became head of the Central Road and Water Construction Bureau. Ertel supervised more of the workshop's daily operation and helped equip a mechanical workshop at the Vienna Polytechnic in 1819–20.

On 16 May 1821 Reichenbach transferred the business to Ertel, though instruments continued for a time to bear Reichenbach's name and he retained an interest in final inspection. Under Ertel the workshop specialised in meridian circles, transit instruments, repeating circles, universal instruments, theodolites and levels. It moved in 1825 to larger premises at the corner of Karlstraße and Luisenstraße. Georg Ertel became his father's partner in 1834, after which the firm traded as T. Ertel & Sohn. Its workforce exceeded 100 during the period of orders for the new Pulkovo Observatory.

The Ertel firm continued to obtain optical flats, prisms, objectives, eyepieces and complete surveying telescopes from Utzschneider's and later Merz's optical works. Account books document this supply relationship into the 1880s, and surviving instruments sometimes carry an Ertel signature on the graduated mechanism and a Merz or Utzschneider–Fraunhofer signature on the telescope.

After Traugott Ertel's death in 1858, the business passed through his sons and later owners. August Diez acquired it in 1890 and shifted emphasis towards serial production of geodetic instruments. It became a joint-stock company in 1911 and changed names and ownership several times, including Ertel-Werk A.G. für Feinmechanik. After wartime and post-war relocations, the works moved from Munich to nearby Puchheim in 1957 and concentrated on construction-surveying instruments. Insolvency proceedings in 1984 ended this line of the enterprise.

=== Merz and Mahler ===
Liebherr left the renewed Utzschneider workshop in 1823 and later taught mechanics at Munich's Polytechnical Central School. Franz Joseph Mahler, who had entered the institute in 1820 and was Liebherr's son-in-law, became head of the mechanical workshop. When Fraunhofer died on 7 June 1826, Utzschneider tested senior employees before choosing Georg Merz to direct optical work. Merz had entered the Benediktbeuern operation in 1808, worked in glass selection and lens manufacture, and become a workshop supervisor. A contract of 17 July 1826 placed Merz over the optical enterprise and Mahler over its mechanical department; the employees were instructed to follow their directions.

One of the first major commissions after Fraunhofer's death was a heliometer for Friedrich Bessel at Königsberg Observatory. The instrument used a divided objective to measure small angular separations. Fraunhofer had completed several suitable six-inch objectives; Merz divided one of them, and Mahler made the equatorial mounting and clockwork. Delivered in March 1829 for about 9,000 guilders, it was the instrument with which Bessel measured the annual parallax of 61 Cygni in 1837–38.

Utzschneider moved the institute to premises in Müllerstraße, where optical grinding, polishing, tube making, casting and precision mechanics were organised in related but distinct shops. A surviving account of the works describes lathes, metalworking rooms and a dividing machine attributed to Liebherr. By the early 1830s the enterprise employed approximately 50 to 60 people, in addition to outworkers who ground spectacles and small lenses or made cases.

The transfer to Merz and Mahler took place in two stages. Under the contract of 17 March 1838, each received a 25-per-cent share while Utzschneider retained half of the business. A second contract, dated 20 January 1839, transferred the remainder, including the Munich workshops and the Benediktbeuern glassworks. The firm then traded as Merz & Mahler.

Merz and Mahler supplied complete instruments as well as optical components for other makers. Their commissions included equipment for Pulkovo, a heliometer for Bonn, and instruments for observatories at Kyiv, Washington and Cincinnati. Mahler died on 21 June 1845. After settling with Mahler's heirs in 1846, Merz continued as sole proprietor and brought his sons Sigmund and Ludwig into the business. The firm used such styles as G. Merz & Sohn, G. Merz & Söhne and G. & S. Merz. Its products included large astronomical objectives and refractors, microscopes, photographic optics, spectroscopes and military and marine instruments.

=== Later years ===
Georg Merz died on 12 January 1867, and Sigmund Merz inherited the business as sole proprietor. Under Sigmund the catalogue expanded to include spectroscopic and military instruments. Competition came from other Munich optical workshops and, later, from industrial firms with specialised glass and optical production. Merz continued to supply large objectives and additions to observatories that already used its instruments.

In 1882–83 Sigmund Merz divided the concern. He kept the production of large astronomical objectives and optical glass under the historical style G. & S. Merz, formerly Utzschneider & Fraunhofer, while Jakob Merz took the general optical and mechanical workshop. Published dates for the end of work at Benediktbeuern refer to different endpoints: Kirmeier gives 1883 and Weber about 1887, whereas Kost records the last glass melts in 1885 and the closure of the glassworks in 1889.

Paul Zschokke acquired the principal workshop in spring 1903 and retained the name G. & S. Merz. Production moved to Pasing in 1907, and the firm became a limited-liability company in 1912. It continued to make astronomical and educational instruments on a smaller scale. The company entered liquidation in 1932 and was deleted from the commercial register in June 1938. A former employee, Georg Tremel, continued to make the firm's school telescopes for several years, but his workshop was a separate business.

== Organisation and production ==
The 1804 contract divided responsibility among design, manufacture and business management. Reichenbach calculated the instruments and carried out critical centring and graduation. Liebherr organised the craftsmen and built the mechanisms. Utzschneider supplied working capital, premises and access to customers. Fraunhofer later directed glassmaking, lens calculation, grinding and optical testing.

Production was not confined to a single building. Before 1819 the main mechanical workshop was in Munich, while glass melting and much optical processing took place at Benediktbeuern. After optical assembly moved to Munich, the glassworks remained a remote supplier of selected crown and flint blanks. The Munich shops included brass and iron working, turning, casting, tube making, circle graduation, lens grinding and polishing, assembly and testing. Some routine optical work was put out to workers near Benediktbeuern and Bichl, who received blanks, gauges, abrasive material and small machines from the firm.

Metalwork and optics remained separate workshop trades. The makers of a divided circle had to centre its axis and graduate its limb; the optical workers selected glass, figured the lens surfaces and aligned them on a common optical axis. Completed instruments brought the two sets of work together. Even after the 1814 separation, Reichenbach–Ertel instruments often used Utzschneider–Fraunhofer optics, and later Ertel instruments used components from Merz.

Surviving signatures may name only one contributor to an instrument. Depending on the object, the inscription can identify a proprietor, a partnership, the mechanical maker, the optical supplier or an established trade name. Some instruments also remained unfinished across a change of partnership and were signed when they were later completed or sold.

== Instruments and customers ==
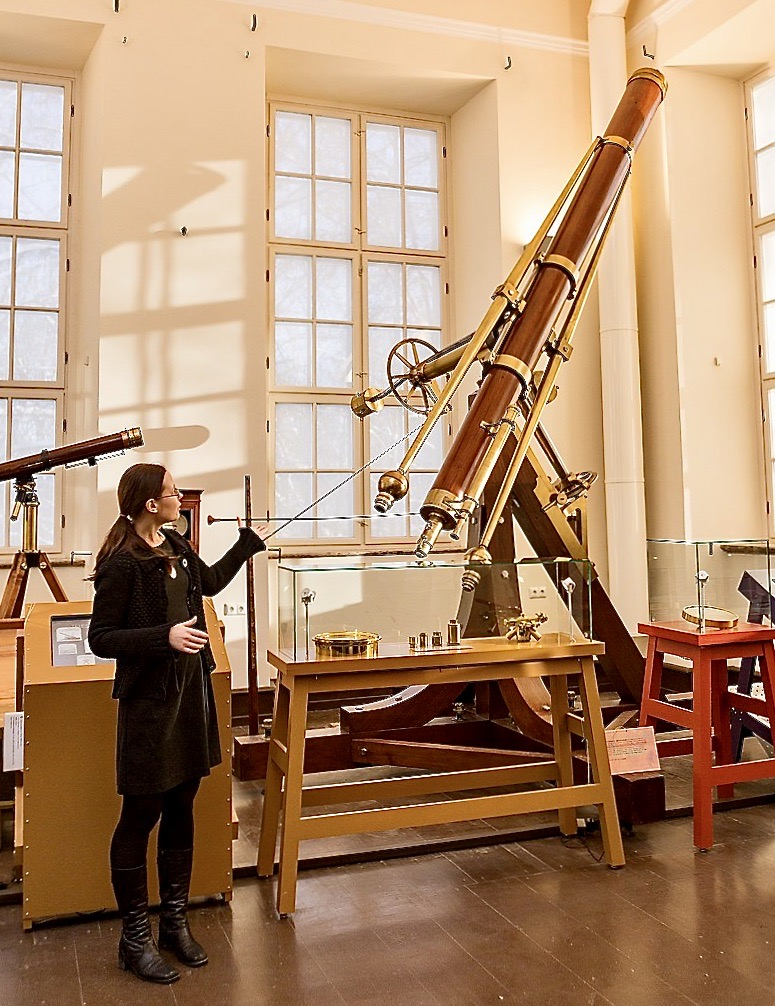
The Fraunhofer refractor delivered to Dorpat (now Tartu) Observatory in 1824. Its optics came from the Utzschneider–Fraunhofer institute and its mounting was completed in the Munich workshops.

The early catalogues concentrated on graduated angular instruments: theodolites, repeating circles, universal instruments, transit instruments and meridian circles. Repetition allowed the observer to accumulate the same angle several times before reading the scale. Universal instruments served both terrestrial triangulation and astronomical observation; meridian circles recorded the passage of a celestial object across the local meridian. The workshops also sold levels, plane-table alidades, base-measurement apparatus, sextants, artificial horizons, clocks and magnetic instruments.

Reichenbach's field instruments were comparatively compact. Their fittings included conical axes and verniers, auxiliary scales used to read fractions of the main divisions. Later instruments used reading microscopes and micrometer screws instead of, or alongside, verniers. Repetition reduced some random reading error, but Reichenbach and Carl Friedrich Gauss noted that friction and movement in a clamped circle could produce systematic error.

Astronomical production depended increasingly on Fraunhofer's optics. The nine-inch refractor delivered to Dorpat Observatory in 1824 combined a large achromatic objective with an equatorial mounting and clock drive. It enabled Friedrich Georg Wilhelm von Struve to observe double stars with greater light-gathering power and steadier tracking than smaller portable instruments.

Reichenbach supplied surveying instruments to Bavarian authorities and astronomical circles to observatories at Buda, Riga and Naples. Reichenbach and Ertel made meridian and transit instruments, including the meridian circle used at Bogenhausen from December 1819. The Utzschneider–Fraunhofer and later Merz workshops supplied Dorpat, Königsberg, Bonn and Pulkovo, followed by customers elsewhere in Europe and the United States.

== Surviving instruments and archives ==
The Deutsches Museum preserves instruments and workshop equipment associated with the institute and its successors. Its digital catalogue includes the 1804 dividing engine attributed to Reichenbach and Liebherr, a precision pendulum clock signed by Utzschneider and Liebherr, and an 1825 meridian circle by Reichenbach and Ertel. The Technical University of Munich's historical collection includes refractors signed Utzschneider and Fraunhofer, theodolites associated with Reichenbach, Liebherr and Utzschneider, and numerous Ertel instruments.

The 1824 Dorpat refractor survives at Tartu Observatory. Other instruments by the Munich workshops are held in astronomical, geodetic and technical collections, including those of the Deutsches Museum and the Technical University of Munich.

The Deutsches Museum Archive holds the principal surviving records. The Reichenbach papers include partnership contracts, accounts, inventories, instrument orders and correspondence. The Utzschneider papers contain material on the glassworks and the optical and mechanical workshops, including price lists and correspondence. The G. & S. Merz archive is dominated by glass-melt records, laboratory journals and optical calculations; little administrative correspondence survives.

== Sources ==
- Bauernfeind, Carl Maximilian von (1877). "Ertel, Traugott Leberecht von". Allgemeine Deutsche Biographie (in German). Vol. 6. Leipzig: Duncker & Humblot. pp. 331–332.
- Deutsches Museum (2023). NL 272 Reichenbach, Georg von (1771–1826): Findbuch (PDF) (Report) (in German). Munich: Deutsches Museum Archiv.
- Deutsches Museum (2023). NL 015 Utzschneider, Joseph von (1763–1840): Findbuch (PDF) (Report) (in German). Munich: Deutsches Museum Archiv.
- Deutsches Museum (2023). FA 015 G. & S. Merz: Findbuch (PDF) (Report) (in German). Munich: Deutsches Museum Archiv.
- Deutsches Museum Digital (2015). "Kreisteilmaschine von Georg von Reichenbach". Deutsches Museum Digital (in German).
- Deutsches Museum Digital (2015). "Astronomische Uhr, inventory number 1948". Deutsches Museum Digital (in German).
- Deutsches Museum Digital (2015). "Meridiankreis mit Wiege von Reichenbach und Ertel". Deutsches Museum Digital (in German).
- "Verzeichniss derjenigen Werkzeuge, welche in der mechanischen Werkstätte Utzschneider, Liebherr et Werner in München um nachstehende Preise verfertigt werden; Verzeichniss der optischen Werkzeuge, welche in dem optischen Institute zu Benedictbeuern Utzschneider et Fraunhofer um beigesetzte Preise verfertigt werden". Zeitschrift für Astronomie und verwandte Wissenschaften (in German). 2: 165–179. 1816.
- Kirmeier, Josef (2008). "Research and production: Glassworks and Optical Institute in Benediktbeuern". Fraunhofer in Benediktbeuern: Glassworks and Workshop (PDF). Munich: Fraunhofer-Gesellschaft. pp. 18–31.
- Weber, Leo (2008). "Joseph von Utzschneider and Joseph von Fraunhofer at the former Benedictine monastery of Benediktbeuern, 1805–1818". Fraunhofer in Benediktbeuern: Glassworks and Workshop (PDF). Munich: Fraunhofer-Gesellschaft. pp. 32–39.
- Kost, Jürgen (2014). Wissenschaftlicher Instrumentenbau der Firma Merz in München (1838–1932) (PDF) (PhD thesis) (in German). University of Hamburg.
- Petzold, Hartmut (2006). "Handwerk mit goldenem Boden: Der Münchner Uhrmacher Joseph Liebherr" (PDF). Kultur & Technik (in German). 30 (3): 22–28.
- Priesner, Claus (1985). "Liebherr, Joseph". Neue Deutsche Biographie (in German). Vol. 14. Berlin: Duncker & Humblot. pp. 490–491.
- Schneider, Ivo (2014). Joseph von Utzschneider: Vision und Wirklichkeit eines neuen Bayern. Beiträge zur Geschichte der Bayerischen Akademie der Wissenschaften (in German). Vol. 3. Regensburg: Friedrich Pustet. ISBN 978-3-7917-2630-4.
- Schnädelbach, Klaus; et al. (2024). Katalog der historischen Messinstrumente (PDF) (in German). Vol. 1. Lehrstuhl für Ingenieurgeodäsie, Technische Universität München.
- Teichmann, Jürgen (2025). "Instrument making in 19th-century Munich". Journal for the History of Astronomy. 56 (3): 373–375. doi:10.1177/00218286251331944.
