= Joseph Liebherr =

German clockmaker and scientific instrument maker (1767–1840)

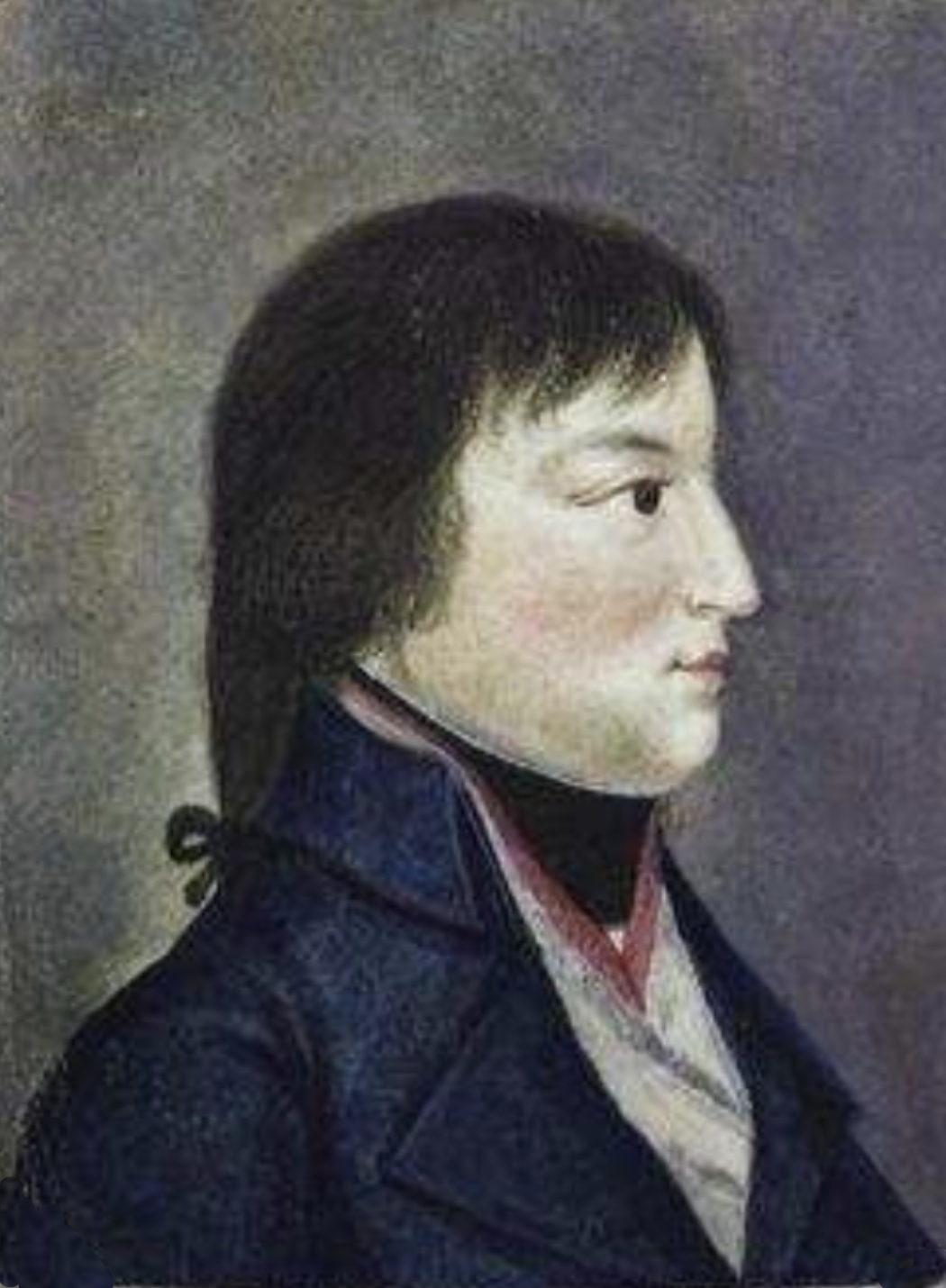
- Watercolour portrait, dated 1803
- Born: Immenstadt im Allgäu, County of Königsegg-Rothenfels, Holy Roman Empire
- Baptised: 30 December 1767
- Died: 8 October 1840; Munich, Kingdom of Bavaria, German Confederation
- Resting place: Alter Südfriedhof, Munich
- Occupations: Clockmaker, scientific instrument maker and teacher
- Known for: Co-founding the Mathematical-Mechanical Institute; development of the circle-dividing engine
- Spouses: Maria Theresia Fischer (m. 1793; died 1800) Clara Seibald (m. 1802; died 1828)
- Children: 15

Joseph Liebherr (baptised 30 December 1767 – 8 October 1840) was a German clockmaker, precision mechanic, scientific instrument maker and teacher. He co-founded the Munich Mathematical-Mechanical Institute and, with Georg Friedrich von Reichenbach, developed a circle-dividing engine used in the manufacture of surveying and astronomical instruments.

Largely self-educated in mathematics and physics, Liebherr progressed from traditional clockmaking to precision-instrument construction. In 1794, he built a gear-cutting machine that used the counting principle later incorporated into the circle-dividing engine. He established a workshop with Reichenbach in 1802; after Joseph von Utzschneider joined them in 1804, it became the Mathematical-Mechanical Institute, which supplied instruments for the Bavarian state survey and observatories elsewhere in Europe. Liebherr left the institute in 1812, and a public dispute with Reichenbach in 1820–1821 over their respective contributions to the dividing engine ended without agreement.

Liebherr subsequently operated an independent workshop and joined Utzschneider and the merchant Carl Friedrich Werner in a new institute. In 1823, he moved to Kempten, where he established a type foundry, before returning to Munich in 1828 as professor of mechanics and head of the workshop at the Polytechnical Central School. He constructed and improved clocks, geodetic and astronomical instruments, teaching models, printing presses and industrial machinery. Liebherr remained at the school until his death in Munich in 1840.

== Early life and training ==
Liebherr was born in Immenstadt im Allgäu, the eldest son of Franz Xaver Liebherr, a clockmaker and mechanic who specialised in turret clocks, and Maria Anna Liebherr (née Speiser). His exact date of birth is not known; 30 December 1767, frequently given as his birthday, is identified in modern biographical literature as his date of baptism. (Note: The older Allgemeine Deutsche Biographie and some later reference works give 30 December 1767 as Liebherr's date of birth. The Neue Deutsche Biographie identifies it as his baptismal date.)

His father trained him in clockmaking. Liebherr later worked at the clock manufactory of Melly and Roux in Konstanz, where he further developed his practical skills. He attended neither a higher school nor a university, instead studying German translations of technical works by French horologists, including Jean-André Lepaute and Ferdinand Berthoud. Through this reading he acquired the mathematical and physical knowledge needed to construct scientific instruments.

In 1791, the surveyor Ignaz Ambros von Amman commissioned Liebherr to make surveying instruments and instructed him in the mathematical and physical principles of instrument construction until about 1794. During this period, Liebherr began to move beyond conventional clockmaking. In 1794, he designed a gear-cutting machine in which a counting mechanism controlled the equal spacing of teeth around a wheel. A machine preserved in the Deutsches Museum bears an inscription attributing its design and construction to Liebherr at Immenstadt in that year, although the inscription may have been added later during his priority dispute with Reichenbach over the circle-dividing engine.

In 1793, Liebherr married Maria Theresia Fischer of Friedberg, who died in 1800; they had three daughters. One of them, Josepha, later married the optician and instrument maker Georg Merz. In 1802, Liebherr married Clara Seibald, who died in 1828; they had twelve children, six of whom died young. One of their daughters married the mechanic Franz Joseph Mahler. Merz and Mahler later became leading figures in the Munich Optical Institute at Benediktbeuern established by Joseph von Utzschneider and his associates.

== Munich instrument making ==
=== Workshop with Reichenbach ===
By 1801, Liebherr had moved to Munich, where he worked for the clockmaker Johann Michael Henggeller while seeking permission to establish himself as an instrument maker. Through the Benedictine mathematician, astronomer and surveyor Ulrich Schiegg, he met Reichenbach in the autumn of 1801. Reichenbach was looking for a mechanic capable of constructing his designs, while Liebherr made a small reflecting sextant to demonstrate his ability and support his application to settle in the city. They established a workshop for mathematical and astronomical instruments in 1802.

The Bavarian Topographical Bureau provided an early market for accurate instruments required by the state survey. The partners built a circle-dividing engine in 1802 and completed an improved version in 1804. The machine produced evenly spaced graduations on the circular scales of theodolites and astronomical instruments. It exceeded the accuracy of Jesse Ramsden's 1775 design and enabled scales to be read to about one arcsecond. Early products made with it included an 18-inch astronomical repeating circle and a 16-inch azimuth circle.

=== Mathematical-Mechanical Institute ===
On 20 August 1804, Utzschneider joined the workshop as its financier and commercial director, forming the Mathematical-Mechanical Institute of Utzschneider, Reichenbach and Liebherr. Their agreement assigned Reichenbach responsibility for scientific and technical design and for the most exacting centring, dividing, pivot and movement work. Liebherr became the institute's first master, assisting Reichenbach and directing the journeymen, while Utzschneider supplied the capital and managed its business affairs. From 1807, Reichenbach was increasingly occupied by state engineering work, while Liebherr continued to supervise the mechanics and the workshop's daily production.

The institute made geodetic and astronomical instruments for the Bavarian survey and for customers outside Bavaria, including the observatories at Buda and Riga. The Continental blockade initially protected it from British competition, but also restricted the supply of high-quality flint glass. In 1807, the production of optical components was moved to the Optical Institute at Benediktbeuern, where Fraunhofer later directed the manufacture of optical glass and lenses. Liebherr also trained younger mechanics, including Traugott Ertel, who later became Reichenbach's partner.

Friction with Reichenbach led Liebherr to leave the institute in 1812. (Note: The Neue Deutsche Biographie, Petzold and Kost date Liebherr's departure to 1812. The older Allgemeine Deutsche Biographie gives 1814, the year in which Reichenbach's partnership with Utzschneider ended.) Under the settlement, he received a small dividing engine, two lathes, an astronomical pendulum clock, an astrolabe and other workshop equipment. He could manufacture most kinds of instrument, but not dividing engines or astronomical instruments with circles more than two feet in diameter. The former institute agreed to pass him orders for specified smaller instruments, while he remained bound to protect its manufacturing secrets.

=== Independent workshop and renewed partnership ===
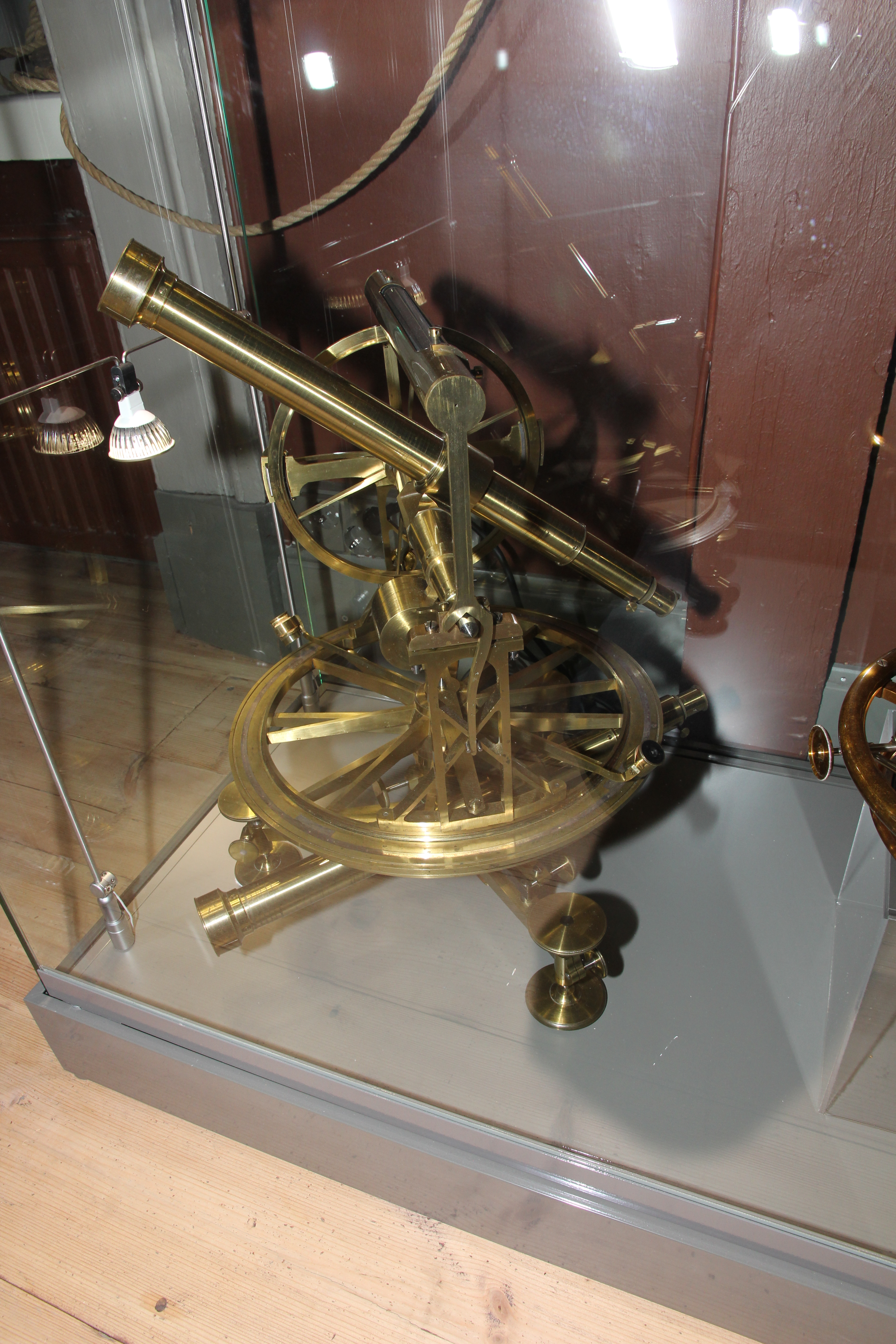
A theodolite made by Utzschneider and Liebherr, c. 1820, now at Helsinki Observatory

Liebherr opened an independent workshop near Munich's Maxtor, offering astronomical, mathematical and physical instruments as well as astronomical pendulum clocks. Following Reichenbach and Utzschneider's separation in 1814, Utzschneider established a new institute with Liebherr and the Munich merchant Carl Friedrich Werner; by 1816, the firm was operating under the name Utzschneider, Liebherr et Werner. (Note: Riekher's index identifies the institute's Werner as Carl Friedrich Werner. Other sources abbreviate his name inconsistently as “C. L. Werner” and “C. I. Werner”; the reason for the discrepancy is not explained.) Its published catalogue offered angular-measuring and levelling instruments, clocks, balances, drawing instruments and workshop machinery. A companion catalogue listed the optical instruments produced by Utzschneider and Fraunhofer at Benediktbeuern. When Carl Friedrich Gauss visited Munich in 1816, he recorded that Liebherr had offered to supply an astronomical pendulum clock within six months at a price Gauss considered unusually low. At the Munich industrial exhibition of 1819, Liebherr received a silver medal for the firm's astronomical, mathematical and physical instruments.

In 1819, the optical institute moved from Benediktbeuern to Munich and was combined with the mechanical workshop. Liebherr continued working in the enlarged enterprise, which manufactured the mechanical and optical parts of complete astronomical instruments in one establishment.

=== Dividing-engine dispute ===
The circle-dividing engine became the subject of a public priority dispute in 1820, after Reichenbach helped establish a mechanical workshop at the Vienna Polytechnic Institute and made the manufacturing method known there. An anonymous notice in Ludwig Wilhelm Gilbert's Annalen der Physik questioned Reichenbach's priority, and Gilbert invited both men to state their cases.

Liebherr replied in 1821 that Reichenbach's method was based on the counting principle of the gear-cutting machine he had constructed in 1794. Reichenbach denied the claim and maintained that he had conceived the dividing engine independently. The dispute produced no agreed allocation of credit. Priesner concluded that Liebherr's 1794 mechanism contained the principle later used for circle division, while Reichenbach had independently conceived a machine around 1800; the successful engine was constructed jointly, and their individual shares cannot be determined precisely.

Liebherr remained associated with Utzschneider until 1823. His final work for the firm included the assembly and adjustment of Fraunhofer's large refractor for the Dorpat Observatory. After its completion, he left Munich for Kempten, where he opened a type foundry.

== Later career ==
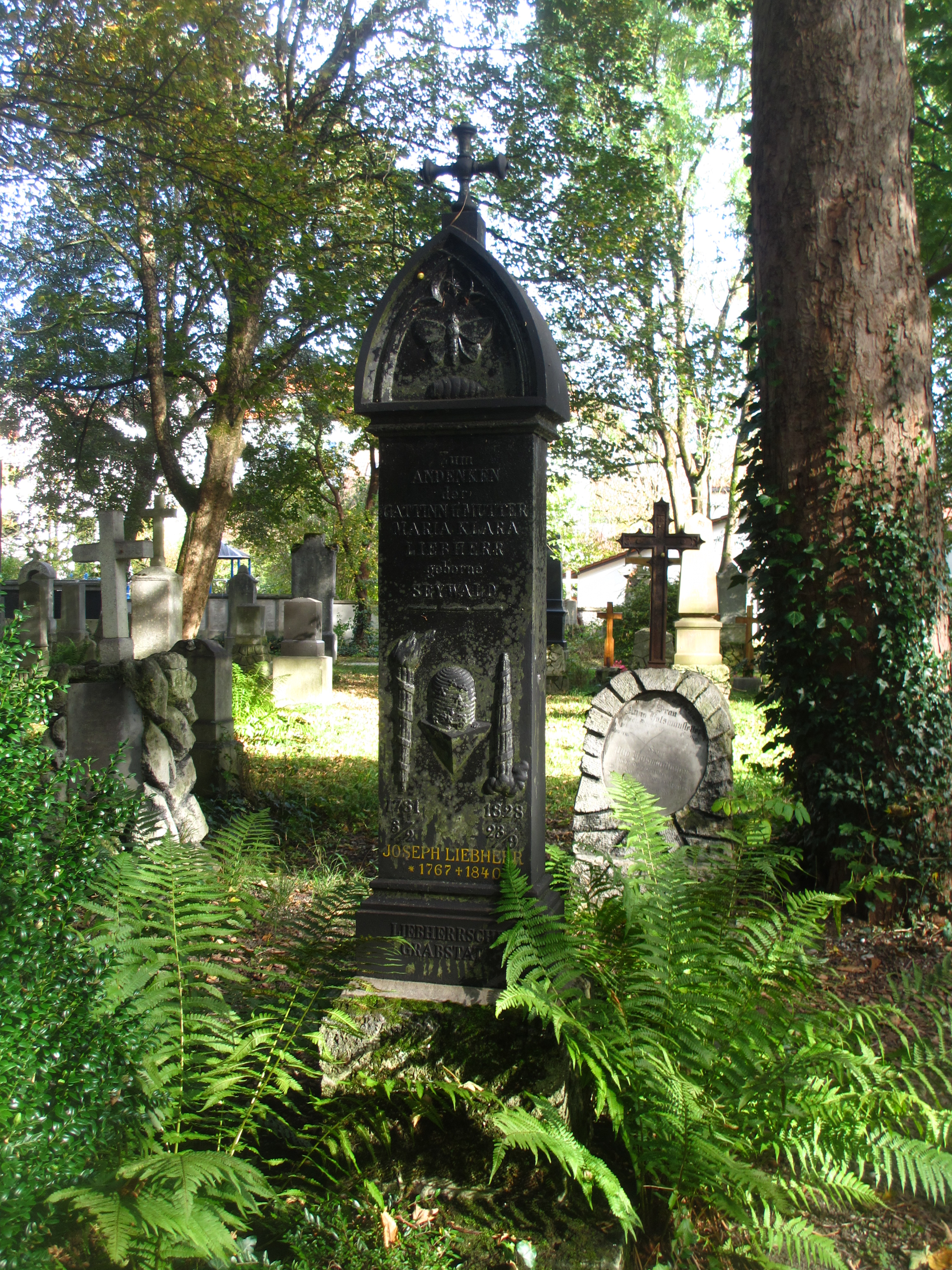
Liebherr's grave at the Alter Südfriedhof in Munich

Liebherr's type foundry did not prosper, and in 1828 he returned to Munich as professor of mechanics and head of the mechanical workshop at the Polytechnical Central School. Established by royal decree in 1827, the school provided advanced technical instruction for trades and manufacturing and was one of the predecessors of the Technical University of Munich. The Central School was dissolved and reorganised in 1833, but Liebherr continued teaching mechanics and directing the workshop until his death.

Liebherr had few students and devoted much of his time to constructing teaching models, improving scientific instruments and repairing the school's apparatus.

Liebherr was also a long-serving member of the administrative committee of the Polytechnical Association in Bavaria. The association examined applications for industrial privileges and advised on technical proposals. Its surviving records from the 1830s include reports by Liebherr on machine tools, pumps, printing machinery and surveying equipment.

Liebherr died at his home at Altheimer Eck No. 20 in Munich on 8 October 1840 and was buried at the Alter Südfriedhof. (Note: The former No. 20 corresponds to present-day Altheimer Eck 15.) After his death, the school's mechanical workshop was combined with the workshop of the general polytechnical collection.

== Instruments and machines ==
Liebherr's astronomical and geodetic work included an astronomical universal instrument for repeated measurements of zenith distance and azimuth, improvements to theodolites and the Borda repeating circle, and the construction of vertical circles. He also designed a new regulator clock and made the public standard clock above the entrance to the Bavarian Academy building in Munich's Neuhausergasse. He contributed practical suggestions to the clock-driven equatorial mount developed for Fraunhofer's large refracting telescopes.

His work in general machinery included a coin-adjusting machine, a toggle press for extracting oil and beet juice, a pantograph and a printing press for which he received a gold medal from the Polytechnical Association. During his renewed association with Utzschneider, he also directed the construction of a hydraulic press and a carding machine for Utzschneider's cloth works.

The Deutsches Museum preserves clocks, Liebherr's 1794 gear-cutting machine and his archival papers. The historical instrument collection of the Technical University of Munich contains a repeating theodolite signed Jos. Liebherr in München i. J. 71; the catalogue interprets the final number as his age and dates the instrument to 1838. Its horizontal and vertical circles could be read to 10 arcseconds, and its construction adapted the Reichenbach–Ertel pattern with modified clamping, levelling and vertical-circle arrangements.

== Sources ==
- Deutsches Museum Archive (2023). "FA 004: Polytechnischer Verein in Bayern" (PDF) (in German).
- Deutsches Museum Archive (10 October 2023). NL 015 Utzschneider, Joseph von (1763–1840) (PDF) (Report) (in German). Munich.
- Holland, Hyacinth (1883). "Liebherr, Joseph". Allgemeine Deutsche Biographie (in German). Vol. 18. Leipzig: Duncker & Humblot. pp. 581–582.
- "Verzeichniß derjenigen Werkzeuge, welche in der mechanischen Werkstätte Utzschneider, Liebherr et Werner in München um nachstehende Preise verfertigt werden". Zeitschrift für Astronomie und verwandte Wissenschaften (in German). 2: 165–172. 1816.
- Kaltenegger, Reiner (2019). Gräber des Alten Südfriedhofs München: Inschriften · Biographien (in German) (1st ed.). Munich: Eigenverlag.
- Kirmeier, Josef (2008). "Research and production: Glassworks and Optical Institute in Benediktbeuern". Fraunhofer in Benediktbeuern: Glassworks and Workshop (PDF). Munich: Fraunhofer-Gesellschaft. pp. 18–31.
- Kost, Jürgen (2014). Wissenschaftlicher Instrumentenbau der Firma Merz in München (1838–1932) (Doctoral dissertation) (in German). University of Hamburg.
- Liebherr, Joseph (1821). "Erklärung des Hrn Mechanikus Liebherr in München". Annalen der Physik und der physikalischen Chemie (in German). 67 (1): 109–110. doi:10.1002/andp.18210670107.
- Petzold, Hartmut (2006). "Handwerk mit goldenem Boden: Der Münchner Uhrmacher und Mechanikus Joseph Liebherr (1767–1840)" (PDF). Kultur & Technik (in German). 30 (3): 22–28.
- Priesner, Claus (1985). "Liebherr, Joseph". Neue Deutsche Biographie (in German). Vol. 14. Berlin: Duncker & Humblot. pp. 490–491.
- Reichenbach, Georg von (1821). "Berichtigung der von Herrn Mechanikus Jos. Liebherr in München abgegebenen Erklärung über die Erfindung meiner Kreiseinteilungsmethode". Annalen der Physik und der physikalischen Chemie (in German). 68 (5): 33–59. doi:10.1002/andp.18210680506.
- Riekher, Rolf (2017). Dick, Wolfgang R.; Hamel, Jürgen (eds.). Der Briefwechsel Joseph von Fraunhofers: Briefe und Dokumente aus der Ära Fraunhofer, Reichenbach und Utzschneider. Acta Historica Astronomiae (in German). Vol. 1. Leipzig: AVA – Akademische Verlagsanstalt. ISBN 978-3-944913-55-1.
- Schnädelbach, Klaus (2024). Katalog der historischen Messinstrumente (PDF) (in German). Vol. 1. Technical University of Munich.
- Stadtgeschichte München. "Damenstift" (in German).
