= Johann Georg von Soldner =

German physicist, mathematician and astronomer (1776–1833)

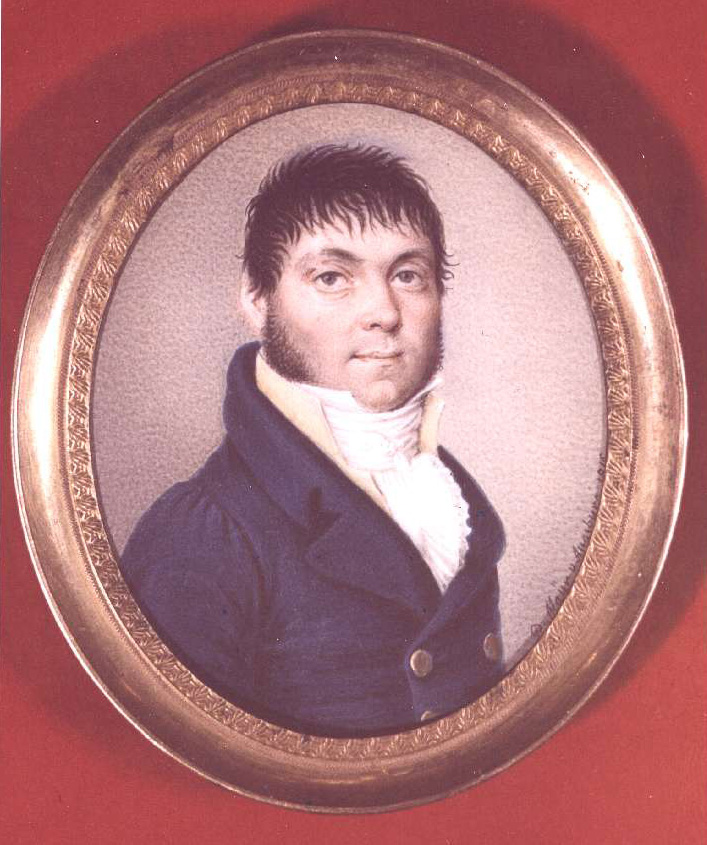
J.G. Soldner

Johann Georg von Soldner (16 July 1776 in Feuchtwangen, Ansbach – 13 May 1833 in Bogenhausen, Munich) was a German physicist, mathematician and astronomer, first in Berlin and later in 1808 in Munich.

== Life ==
He was born in Feuchtwangen in Ansbach as the son of the farmer Johann Andreas Soldner. He received two years' teaching at the Feuchtwanger Latin School.

Soon Soldner's mathematical talent was discovered: Soldner managed to measure the fields of his father by self-built instruments. At night, he studied math textbooks and maps. Since he never had been to high school, he pursued private studies of languages and mathematics in Ansbach, in 1796.

In 1797, he came to Berlin, where he worked under the astronomer Johann Elert Bode as a geometer, and was involved with astronomical and geodetic studies. From 1804 to 1806, he was the leader of a team which worked on the survey of Ansbach.

In 1808, he was invited by Joseph von Utzschneider to Munich to work on trigonometry for the newly formed Tax Survey Commission. For his services to the theoretical basis for the Bavarian land survey Soldner was knighted. In 1815 he was appointed as an astronomer and he was a member of the Academy of Sciences at Munich. In 1816, Soldner was appointed as the director of the observatory in Bogenhausen in Munich, which was built from 1816 to 1818 due to the co-operation of Utzschneider, Georg Friedrich von Reichenbach and Joseph von Fraunhofer.

Beginning with 1828, Soldner was unable to completely fulfill his duties because of a liver disease. As a result, his young assistant Johann von Lamont (under his supervision) led the operations of the observatory. Soldner died in Bogenhausen and was buried in the cemetery on the western side of the St. Georg church.

== Work ==
The Ramanujan–Soldner constant and the Soldner coordinate system are named for him. The latter was used until the middle of the 20th century in Germany. In 1809, Soldner calculated the Euler–Mascheroni constant's value to 24 decimal places. He also published on the logarithmic integral function.

Light bending

Soldner is now mostly remembered for having concluded — based on Newton's corpuscular theory of light — that light would be diverted by heavenly bodies. In a paper written in 1801 and published in 1804, he calculated the amount of deflection of a light ray by a star and wrote: "If one substitute into tang ω the acceleration of gravity on the surface of the sun, and the radius on that body is set to unity, one finds ω=0,84". Soldner already noted that if it were possible to observe fixed stars in close distance to the Sun, it might be important to take this effect into consideration. However, because (at that time) such observations were impossible, Soldner concluded that those effects can be neglected.

Soldner's work on the effect of gravity on light came to be considered less relevant during the nineteenth century, as "corpuscular" theories and calculations based on them were increasingly considered to have been discredited in favour of wave theories of light. Other prescient work that became unpopular and largely forgotten for similar reasons include possibly Henry Cavendish's light-bending calculations, John Michell's 1783 study of gravitational horizons and the spectral shifting of light by gravity, and even Isaac Newton's study in Principia of the gravitational bending of the paths of "corpuscles", and his description of light-bending in Opticks.

Albert Einstein calculated and published a value for the amount of gravitational light-bending in light skimming the Sun in 1911, leading Philipp Lenard to accuse Einstein of plagiarising Soldner's result. Lenard's accusation against Einstein is usually considered to have been at least partly motivated by Lenard's Nazi sympathies and his enthusiasm for the Deutsche Physik movement, although it must be pointed out that Nazis were not around in 1911. At the time, Einstein may well have been genuinely unaware of Soldner's work, or he may have considered his own calculations to be independent and free-standing, requiring no references to earlier research. Einstein's 1911 calculation was based on the idea of gravitational time dilation. In any case, Einstein's subsequent 1915 general theory of relativity argued that all these calculations had been incomplete, and that the Newtonian arguments, combined with light-bending effects due to gravitational time dilation, gave a combined prediction that was twice as high as the earlier predictions.
