= Joseph von Utzschneider =

Bavarian civil servant, politician and industrialist (1763–1840)

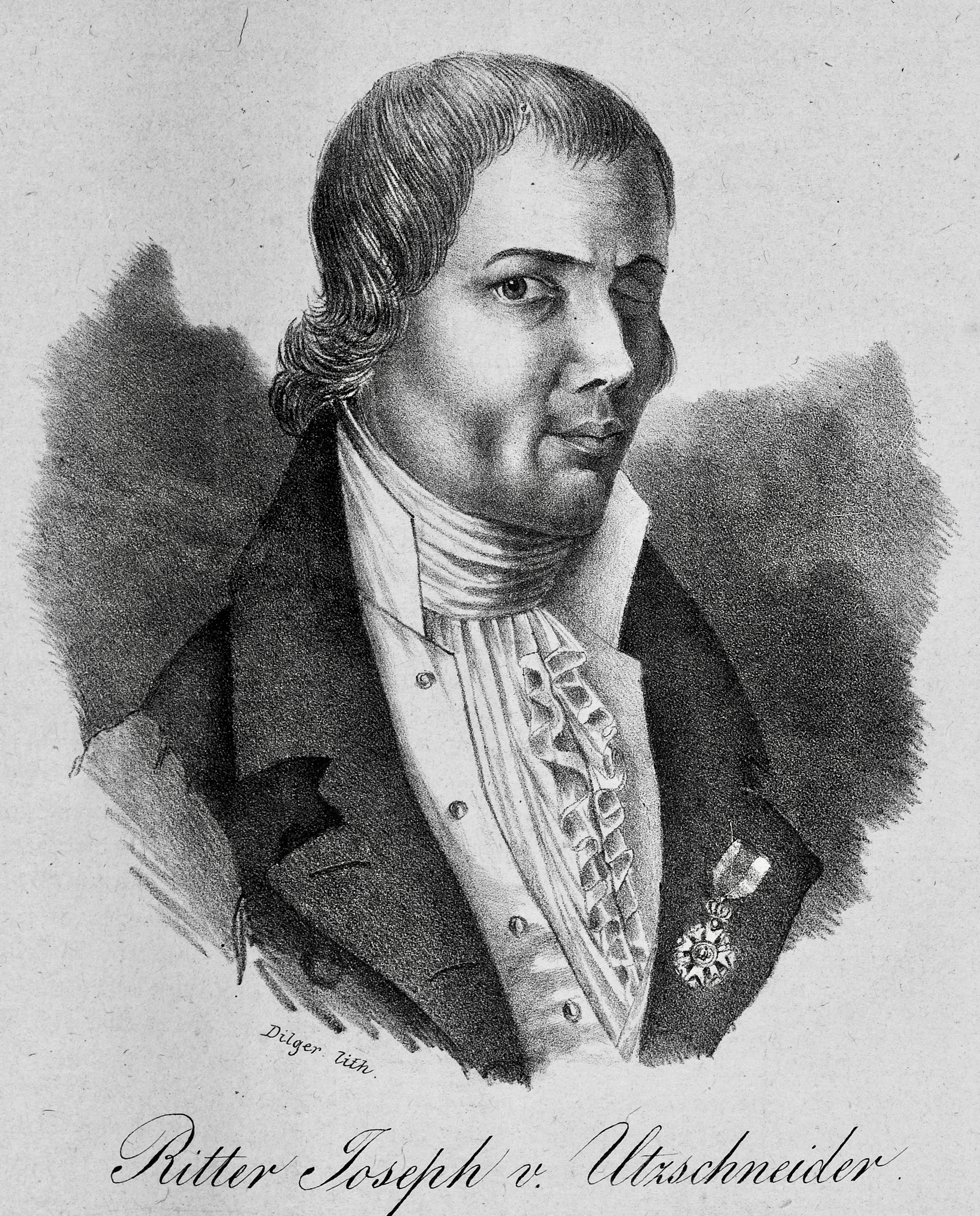
- Lithograph, before 1847
- Born: Joseph Utzschneider; 2 March 1763; Rieden am Staffelsee, Electorate of Bavaria, Holy Roman Empire
- Died: 31 January 1840 (aged 76); Munich, Kingdom of Bavaria, German Confederation
- Resting place: Alter Südfriedhof, Munich
- Education: University of Ingolstadt
- Occupations: Civil servant, politician, industrialist
- Spouse: Amalie Walch (m. 1786)
- Children: 1
- Awards: Order of Merit of the Bavarian Crown

Joseph von Utzschneider (born Joseph Utzschneider; 2 March 1763 – 31 January 1840) was a Bavarian civil servant, politician and industrialist who was ennobled as Ritter von Utzschneider in 1808. During two periods in government service, he worked in forestry and salt administration, public finance, cadastral surveying and the management of the Bavarian state debt. He subsequently served as Munich's second mayor from 1819 to 1823. From 1819 until his death, he represented Munich and later landowners in the Chamber of Deputies.

In 1804, Utzschneider joined Georg Friedrich von Reichenbach and Joseph Liebherr in the Munich Mathematical-Mechanical Institute that manufactured surveying and astronomical instruments. He acquired the former Benediktbeuern Abbey in 1805 and established glass production there, initially for consumer goods and subsequently for precision optics. The enterprise employed Joseph von Fraunhofer, whose systematic work on optical glass, lenses and measuring methods made the firm's telescopes sought by European observatories. Utzschneider provided capital, premises, sales management and commercial direction. After Fraunhofer's death in 1826, he retained the institute until selling it to Georg Merz and Franz Joseph Mahler in 1839.

In 1799–1800, Utzschneider argued that new taxes and public borrowing should require representative consent. After returning to office, he directed commissions for cadastral taxation and state-debt repayment. As a deputy, he advocated protective customs duties. He also promoted vocational and technical education. His economic programme combined protective and regulatory measures: he supported licensing controls and joined demands for restrictions on Jewish itinerant traders, although he also argued that permanently resident Jews should bear civic duties and receive corresponding rights.

== Early life and education ==
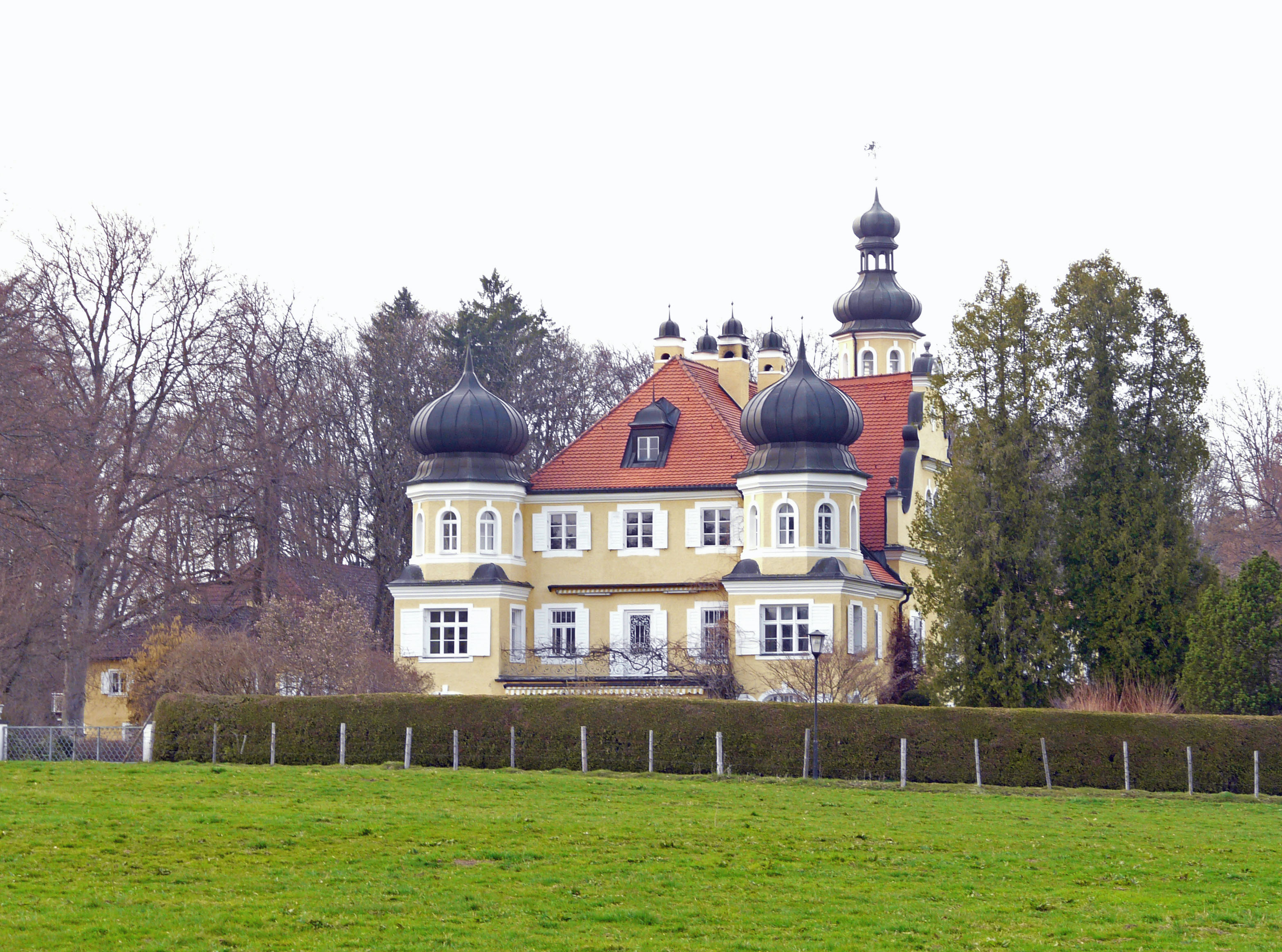
Schloss Rieden developed from the Rieden estate where Utzschneider was born. Its main house was built in 1760, expanded in 1880 and partly rebuilt following a fire in 1887.

Joseph Utzschneider was born at Rieden on the Staffelsee on 2 March 1763, the eldest of nine children of the farmer and horse dealer Andreas Utzschneider and Maria Utzschneider (née Andrée). His mother inherited a farm at Rieden that had belonged to her family since the fifteenth century.

From 1768 to 1770, Utzschneider attended the village school in Uffing, followed in 1770–71 by a short period at a Latin school in Polling. (Note: Schneider cautions that almost all surviving information about Utzschneider's childhood and education derives directly or indirectly from Utzschneider's own later statements and may therefore reflect subjective memory and interpretation.) A hunting accident in 1772 caused the loss of sight in his left eye. His maternal uncle Andreas Andrée, secretary and paymaster to Duchess Maria Anna of Sulzbach, paid for private lessons that prepared him to enter Munich's Wilhelmsgymnasium in 1773. Utzschneider remained at the gymnasium until 1778.

In 1778, Utzschneider became a private secretary to Maria Anna and helped administer her Schwaiganger estate. That year, the duchess sent him to deliver a letter to Frederick II of Prussia during the dispute over Elector Charles Theodore's plans to exchange Bavarian territory with Austria. From 1778 to 1780, he attended the Marianische Landesakademie, a former cadet school supported by Maria Anna.

Utzschneider matriculated in law at the University of Ingolstadt in 1781, while continuing his duties in Munich and preparing largely through private study. (Note: The surviving evidence does not establish which lectures Utzschneider attended at Ingolstadt; Schneider describes him as having prepared largely through self-study while remaining in Maria Anna's service.) He received a licentiate in civil and canon law on 26 July 1783 and a doctorate in philosophy on 14 August. He then taught cameral sciences at the Marianische Landesakademie.

Utzschneider entered the Illuminati as a novice in 1782, attained the rank of Minerval in 1783 and probably left the order in December of that year. In 1785, after the Bavarian government had prohibited the order, he gave the authorities a statement about its organisation; in 1786, he contributed to a government-supported publication intended to demonstrate the order's dangers. He married Amalie Walch of Dillingen in 1786. Their daughter Anna, born in 1787, later married the Bavarian civil servant Thomas Knorr.

== State service ==
=== Forestry and salt administration ===
Utzschneider entered Bavarian government service in 1784 as an unpaid councillor with a seat and vote in the court finance chamber; he began receiving a salary in 1786. His early work included the drainage and cultivation of moorland and the measurement of electoral forests. As senior forestry commissioner from 1786 to 1791, he helped reorganise forest administration and advocated surveys, regulated cutting and planned regeneration in forests that supplied the saltworks. He also developed a training programme for forestry personnel; the government approved a forestry school in November 1790, and the institution operated until 1803.

After assignments at Burghausen and on the Donaumoos reclamation commission, Utzschneider entered the Berchtesgaden salt administration. From 1795 to 1798, he headed the chief salt office at Berchtesgaden, where his responsibilities covered salt production and the forests that provided fuel for the works.

=== Finance and constitutional proposals ===
Following the accession of Elector Maximilian IV Joseph, Utzschneider became director of the customs and commerce deputation in April 1799 and a referendary in the finance department in June. On 11 July 1799, he presented the Secret State Conference with a report warning that Bavaria faced insolvency and recommending military savings, changes in debt administration and measures to restore public credit. The government appointed him to commissions for debt reduction and military economies one week later.

On 10 August 1799, after the representatives of the estates declined further military financing, Utzschneider asked the elector to summon a Landtag. Other ministers opposed an immediate assembly, and Schneider describes their objections as arising from fears that a meeting of the estates would limit the government's freedom of action during the financial and military crisis. Utzschneider continued to argue that new taxes and public borrowing should require agreement between the ruler and a representative body.

On 7 March 1800, Utzschneider submitted a draft declaration of provincial liberties to the elector. The proposal retained monarchical executive authority but would have replaced the old estates with a twenty-five-member representative body drawn from landowners and towns. It required agreement on new taxes, scrutiny of their collection and use, and a plan for repaying each new public debt within a generation. It also proposed a uniform cadastre based on property and productive value, legal protections for tenant farmers, limits on seigneurial jurisdiction and the removal of most guild restrictions beyond proof of competence and local economic viability. The draft was not enacted; Utzschneider republished it in 1837 after a deputy accused him of having planned the overthrow of the Bavarian constitution.

Utzschneider's constitutional views differed from those of the leading minister Maximilian von Montgelas, who considered them politically impractical. In June 1801, the elector placed Utzschneider in provisional retirement on full salary.

=== Cadastre and state debt ===
Utzschneider returned to government in February 1807 as a privy referendary and general administrator of the saltworks. In June 1807, he became one of the two leaders of a commission preparing a uniform system of direct taxation for the enlarged kingdom. From 1808, as sole head of the tax-survey commission, he directed the measurement of property for taxation and employed specialists including Johann Georg von Soldner. The programme combined triangulation with parcel surveys and estimates of productive value, replacing disparate assessments inherited from Bavaria's formerly separate territories. The commission created a lithographic department from 1808 to reproduce cadastral plans, and Alois Senefelder joined the operation in 1809.

Utzschneider proposed a permanent cadastral commission in March 1810, and he subsequently organised the preparation of land-tax registers as head of the tax-cadastre commission. In August 1811, he also became head of the central state-debt repayment commission. His debt programme prioritised restoring regular payments to creditors and assigning specified revenues to amortisation. Repeated disputes with Montgelas, particularly over the urgency and financing of debt repayment, led Utzschneider to request dismissal from all his offices on 9 September 1814. The dismissal ended his salary, official titles and insignia.

Utzschneider received the Order of Merit of the Bavarian Crown in 1808, which conferred personal nobility, and his title became hereditary in 1813.

== Entrepreneurship ==
=== Benediktbeuern and precision instruments ===
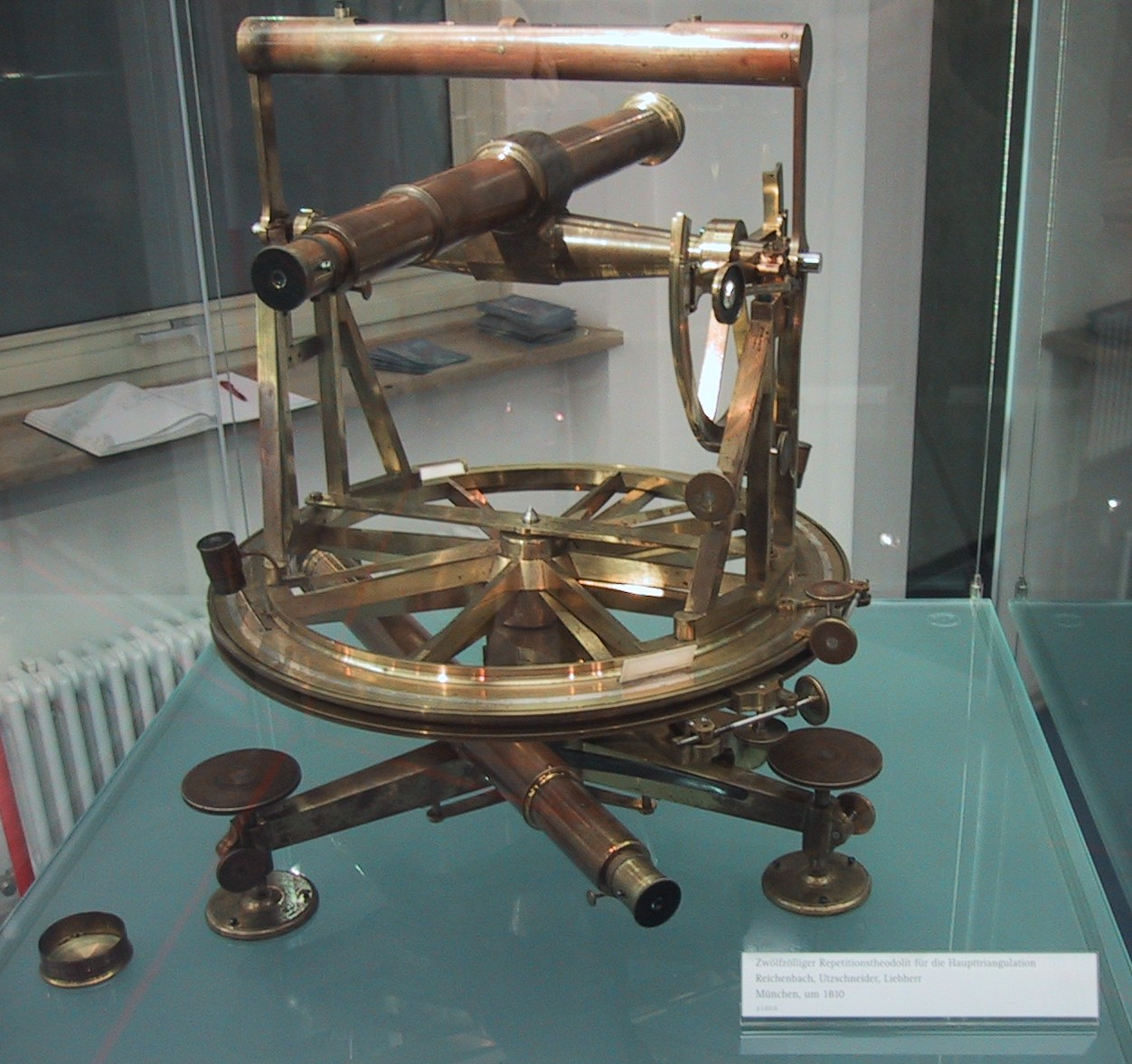
A repetition theodolite manufactured by Reichenbach, Utzschneider and Liebherr in Munich, c. 1810

During his first retirement from government, Utzschneider obtained permission to establish a leather factory in Munich on 7 August 1801. On 20 August 1804, he formed a partnership with Reichenbach and Liebherr in the Mathematical-Mechanical Institute, which manufactured instruments for surveying and astronomy. Reichenbach and Liebherr supplied mechanical expertise, while Utzschneider financed premises and equipment and managed sales.

On 3 May 1805, Utzschneider offered 55,000 guilders for the former Benediktbeuern Abbey and associated buildings; the Bavarian state accepted the proposal. His purchase initially supported agriculture and consumer-glass production, with optical glass becoming the more important product as the enterprise developed. Because high-quality crown and flint glass was scarce and largely imported from England, he recruited the Swiss glassmaker Pierre-Louis Guinand to Benediktbeuern. The first glass melts took place in January 1806, and Guinand's stirring process improved the homogeneity of the glass.

Fraunhofer joined the enterprise in 1806 and increasingly assumed responsibility for optical production at Benediktbeuern. In 1807, Utzschneider incorporated the glassworks into the Mathematical-Mechanical Institute, and in 1809 the optical operation became a separate institute in which Reichenbach and Fraunhofer were partners. Fraunhofer was placed in charge of the Benediktbeuern operation in 1811, which contributed to Guinand's departure for Switzerland in 1814.

=== Fraunhofer and the Optical Institute ===
Utzschneider's expansion of the Benediktbeuern works required substantial capital: Kirmeier records an additional personal investment of 60,000 guilders beyond the Munich institute's contribution. Disagreement over the scale and risks of the operation led Reichenbach and Utzschneider to separate their businesses in 1814. Utzschneider then established a competing institute with Liebherr and the Munich merchant Carl Friedrich Werner. (Note: Werner's initials are given inconsistently in the sources: Kirmeier calls him “C. L. Werner”, while the Deutsches Museum Archive uses “C. I. Werner”. The index to the edited correspondence of Joseph von Fraunhofer identifies the correspondent as Carl Friedrich Werner, although the sources inspected do not explicitly explain the differing initials.) Fraunhofer received a share valued at 10,000 guilders, but was not entitled to withdraw that sum from the firm's capital.

Under Fraunhofer's technical direction, production shifted from consumer glass towards optical glass and scientific instruments. Fraunhofer selected purer raw materials, carried out systematic melting trials, improved the evaluation and grinding of glass and developed methods for constructing larger achromatic lenses. The resulting refracting telescopes were purchased by major European observatories, giving the Benediktbeuern glassworks and the Utzschneider–Fraunhofer firm an international reputation.

Utzschneider sold most of the Benediktbeuern estate back to the Bavarian state in 1818 for 250,000 guilders but retained the optical-glass operation and rooms used by the institute. The instrument-making business moved to Munich, while glass continued to be melted at Benediktbeuern.

After Fraunhofer died in 1826, Utzschneider placed Merz in charge of optics and Mahler in charge of processing. Utzschneider personally conducted the optical-glass melts until Merz assumed that work in 1832. In January 1839, Merz and Mahler purchased the Munich institute and Benediktbeuern glassworks and continued them as Merz & Mahler.

=== Other enterprises and finances ===
Utzschneider also invested in a cloth factory, breweries, agricultural estates and experiments in beet-sugar production. In 1829, he acquired the neglected Erching estate, drained part of its moorland and developed it as a model farm with sugar-beet cultivation.

Many of his ventures were financed largely with borrowed money, and he later sold several of his largest enterprises. He was Munich's highest-taxed citizen in 1821, but the Neue Deutsche Biographie describes his finances as ruined by 1839.

== Political career ==
=== Munich municipal government ===
After Montgelas left office in 1817, Utzschneider unsuccessfully sought to return to the civil service. Munich's electors chose him as second mayor in 1818, and he served from the beginning of 1819 until April 1823. (Note: The surviving records do not permit an exact reconstruction of how duties were divided between Munich's two mayors during Utzschneider's term.)

Only fragments of Utzschneider's municipal working notes survive, including entries for twelve days in January, ten days in August and one day in October 1819. On 1 January, he began examining the city's hospital administration; on 2 January, he considered workhouses and measures against begging; and on 5 January, the magistrate approved changes to hospital management. He later worked on hospital instructions and building needs, a municipal property cadastre, a register of trades and plans for an iron bridge proposed by Reichenbach.

On 11 and 12 January 1819, Utzschneider proposed restricting the number of Jewish households and commercial licences in Munich. The surviving minutes record no decision, and Schneider infers that the magistrate did not support the proposal. The episode was consistent with wider pressure from Christian merchants, in which Utzschneider was a prominent participant, for additional restrictions on Jewish peddling.

Utzschneider prepared a detailed plan for a higher civic school that combined general education with mathematics, natural science, drawing, commerce and modern languages. He proposed places for 100 day pupils and considered an additional residential seminary for as many as 120 students. The magistrate did not implement the plan in its original form.

On 22 July 1821, Utzschneider proposed a municipal savings bank for workers, servants and small tradespeople, with deposits from one to 300 guilders and a city guarantee. The magistrate founded the institution on his proposal, and it opened at the beginning of 1824.

The Munich Court and National Theatre burned during the night of 14–15 January 1823. After the king and ministers criticised the city's response, Utzschneider defended the magistrate and attributed failures to unclear command and obstruction by military personnel at the scene. Munich's elected municipal representatives formally thanked him for that defence.

In a memorandum dated 8 January 1823, Utzschneider also opposed rebuilding a continuous wall around Munich, arguing that it would be costly and would constrain urban expansion. He favoured legal and administrative control of construction beyond the old boundaries and discussed a canal as one possible boundary and transport feature.

Utzschneider requested resignation on 6 April 1823; the king approved it on 8 April, the magistrate was informed on 13 April and a successor took office on 15 April. Utzschneider wrote that the second mayor had insufficient authority and that the office gave him too little scope to influence trade and industry.

=== Chamber of Deputies ===
Utzschneider entered the Chamber of Deputies when the first parliament under the 1818 constitution assembled in 1819. He sat in all eight parliaments held between 1819 and his death on 31 January 1840. Except in 1831, when he chaired the debt-repayment committee, he served on the taxation committee and repeatedly acted as its chairman.

Utzschneider opened the chamber's detailed debate on the 1819 state budget. His reports examined ordinary revenue and expenditure, the royal civil list, diplomatic costs and military spending. He argued that the chamber should distinguish ordinary from exceptional expenditure and should not approve revenue without examining the purposes for which it would be spent.

During the same parliament, Utzschneider reported on state enterprises, public debt, commerce and the regulation of Jewish itinerant trade. He stated that Jews permanently resident in Bavaria should fulfil the obligations of citizens and receive corresponding rights, but he supported restrictions on peddling and on commercial activity by people without local settlement rights. The chamber adopted a joint resolution asking the government for tighter enforcement against itinerant trade.

In 1822, Utzschneider supported a state bank that would gather capital for loans to agriculture and industry at an interest rate not exceeding five per cent. The chamber rejected the proposal by eighty votes to one. In debate on a trade ordinance, he opposed immediate unrestricted freedom of trade and instead favoured licences based on competence and local demand, simplified examinations for masters, support for exports and time-limited privileges for new processes.

On 5 March 1825, Utzschneider submitted a programme for agriculture, manufacturing and commerce. He proposed reducing export duties on Bavarian goods, lowering duties on industrial raw materials and raising them on finished imports and luxury goods. The chamber endorsed reductions in transit and export charges but left the extent of import protection largely to the government.

As chairman of a customs committee in 1827 and 1828, Utzschneider prepared reports on a new customs law and a tariff containing more than 1,200 classifications. The chamber examined the classifications individually, and only part of his protectionist programme entered the provisional law of 1828. He also acted as co-reporter on land- and house-tax legislation, defending measured parcels and assessed productive value as the basis of direct taxation.

In 1831, Utzschneider proposed appointing Montgelas as a minister-president without a departmental portfolio to mediate among the king, ministers and legislature; the king did not respond. During the same parliament, he defended licensing based on local demand, proposed directing lottery revenue to education and published a forty-five-page plan for reorganising schools from elementary education to university. The plan gave particular weight to civic, vocational and polytechnical institutions serving manufacturing, commerce and technical government employment.

In 1834, Utzschneider reported on plans for the Rhine–Main–Danube Canal, supported freer trade in grain and proposed technical training for soldiers that could be used in civilian employment. In 1837, he again chaired the taxation committee and reported on the saltworks, mines, mint, state estates and the costs of the cadastre. The chamber supported a committee proposal to abolish the state lottery, but the king withheld assent. Utzschneider was re-elected chairman of the taxation committee when parliament opened in 1840.

== Technical education and associations ==
Utzschneider was member number 77 of the Polytechnical Association of Bavaria and joined its central administrative committee in 1820. He chaired the association in 1821–22 and from 1829 to 1833, served as deputy chairman from 1826 and delivered twenty lectures in 1821. Through the association and its Kunst- und Gewerbeblatt, he promoted exhibitions, the dissemination of manufacturing knowledge and practical instruction for craftsmen and entrepreneurs. He also participated in the Agricultural Association of Bavaria, which supported the circulation of agricultural knowledge.

In 1825, the Chamber of Deputies approved Utzschneider's renewed proposal for polytechnical schools by 100 votes to 10. After modification in the upper chamber, a royal resolution of 27 September 1827 established the Munich Polytechnical Central School. Utzschneider was appointed its provisional head without salary, thirteen teachers were appointed and classes began on 19 November 1827. The school offered mathematics, mechanics, technical drawing, chemistry and related subjects to pupils preparing for technical occupations. Utzschneider criticised its low entrance age and initial academic standards, arguing that it should become a more advanced institution rather than merely an extension of elementary schooling.

A reorganisation in 1833 implemented major elements of the educational system Utzschneider had proposed in 1831. The former central school became the Munich branch of three similarly organised polytechnical schools in Munich, Augsburg and Nuremberg, with mathematics, natural sciences and drawing forming the principal subjects. Utzschneider remained administrative head of the Munich school until his death. (Note: Most ministerial records concerning Utzschneider's tenure at the Polytechnical School were destroyed, and Schneider describes the surviving evidence for his work there as fragmentary.)

After Utzschneider's death, an engineering course was introduced in the 1840–41 academic year and was later expanded into a school of construction and engineering. The Munich institution formed an institutional predecessor of the New Polytechnical School established in 1868, from which the present Technical University of Munich dates its formal foundation. Utzschneider had also supported the young Carl Maximilian von Bauernfeind and encouraged him to enter the Munich engineering course. Bauernfeind subsequently helped reorganise higher technical education in Bavaria and became the first director of the New Polytechnical School in 1868.

The Bavarian Academy of Sciences and Humanities elected Utzschneider an honorary member in 1818.

== Death ==
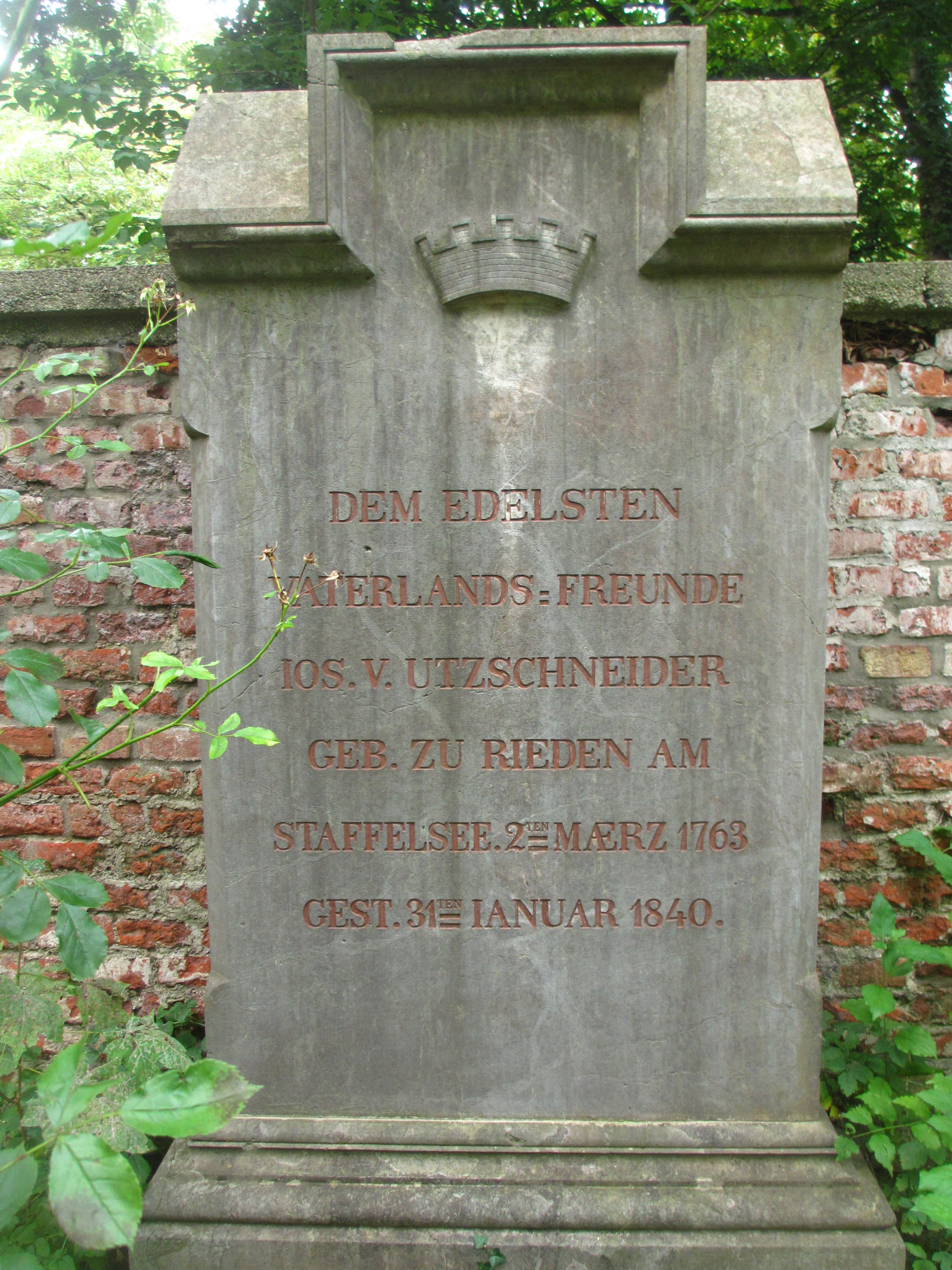
Utzschneider's grave at the Alter Südfriedhof in Munich

On 29 January 1840, Utzschneider and fellow deputy Silberhorn were travelling to a parliamentary sitting when their hired carriage overturned near the Giesing hill in Munich. Utzschneider suffered four broken ribs and a severe concussion and died late on 31 January, aged 76. He was buried in an honorary grave at the Alter Südfriedhof. Amalie von Utzschneider died in 1842.

== Historiography and papers ==
Carl Maximilian von Bauernfeind delivered a rectoral address on Utzschneider in 1880 and wrote his Allgemeine Deutsche Biographie entry in 1895. Ivo Schneider's 2014 monograph, published in the Bavarian Academy's series on its history, drew on material in the Deutsches Museum Archive, the Bavarian Main State Archive, the Munich City Archive and other collections, as well as printed parliamentary and administrative records. Esteban Mauerer published a shorter modern synthesis in the Neue Deutsche Biographie in 2016.

The Deutsches Museum Archive holds Utzschneider's surviving papers, including biographical material, diaries, political and administrative manuscripts and correspondence dating from 1768 to 1843.

== Selected works ==
- Der Illuminatismus in Baiern, in Drey merkwürdige Aussagen, die innere Einrichtung des Illuminatenordens in Baiern betreffend (1786).
- Francesco Mengotti, Abhandlung über den Kolbertismus, oder, Die Freyheit des Kommerzes (editor and translator, 1794).
- Entwurf zu einer neuen Erklärung der Landesfreyheit in Baiern (1800).
- Beyträge zur Land- und Staatswirthschaft (1804).
- Antrag an die hohe Kammer der Abgeordneten zur Begründung und Erhaltung des Wohlstandes der baierischen Güterbesitzer, zur Beförderung des vaterländischen Gewerbfleißes und zur Belebung des Handels in Baiern (1825).
- Kurzer Umriß der Lebens-Geschichte des Herrn Dr. Joseph von Fraunhofer (1826).
- Antrag an die hohe Kammer der Abgeordneten zur Beförderung des Unterrichts in den bayerischen Schulanstalten (1831).
- Mit welchen Schwierigkeiten begann im Jahre 1799 und 1800 die Regierung Sr. Majestät des Königs Maximilian Joseph in Bayern? (1837).

== Sources ==
- Bavariathek (n.d.). "Utzschneider, Joseph Ritter von". Geschichte des Bayerischen Parlaments (in German). Haus der Bayerischen Geschichte.
- Bauernfeind, Carl Maximilian von (1880). Joseph von Utzschneider und seine Leistungen auf staats- und volkswirthschaftlichem Gebiet (PDF) (in German). Munich: G. Franz.
- Bauernfeind, Carl Maximilian von (1895). "Utzschneider, Josef von". Allgemeine Deutsche Biographie (in German). Vol. 39. Leipzig: Duncker & Humblot. pp. 420–440.
- Deutsches Museum Archive (10 October 2023). NL 015 Utzschneider, Joseph von (1763–1840) (PDF) (Report) (in German). Munich.
- Hoyer, Egbert Ritter von (1902). "Bauernfeind, Karl Max von". Allgemeine Deutsche Biographie (in German). Vol. 46. Leipzig: Duncker & Humblot. pp. 241–243.
- Kirmeier, Josef (2008). "Research and production: Glassworks and Optical Institute in Benediktbeuern" (PDF). Fraunhofer in Benediktbeuern: Glassworks and Workshop. Munich: Fraunhofer-Gesellschaft. pp. 18–31.
- Mauerer, Esteban (2016). "Utzschneider, Joseph Ritter von". Neue Deutsche Biographie (in German). Vol. 26. Berlin: Duncker & Humblot. pp. 681–683.
- Rädlinger, Christine (2000). Geschichte der Stadtkämmerei München im 19. und 20. Jahrhundert (PDF) (in German). Munich: Landeshauptstadt München, Stadtkämmerei.
- Riekher, Rolf (2017). Dick, Wolfgang R.; Hamel, Jürgen (eds.). Der Briefwechsel Joseph von Fraunhofers: Briefe und Dokumente aus der Ära Fraunhofer, Reichenbach und Utzschneider. Acta Historica Astronomiae (in German). Vol. 62. Leipzig: Akademische Verlagsanstalt. ISBN 978-3-944913-55-1.
- Schneider, Ivo (2014). Joseph von Utzschneider: Vision und Wirklichkeit eines neuen Bayern. Beiträge zur Geschichte der Bayerischen Akademie der Wissenschaften (in German). Vol. 3. Regensburg: Verlag Friedrich Pustet. ISBN 978-3-7917-2630-4.
- Staffelseemuseum (n.d.). "Das Schloss Rieden". Staffelseemuseum (in German). Heimat- und Museumsverein Seehausen am Staffelsee.
- Technical University of Munich (n.d.). "Chronicle". Technical University of Munich.
- Ullmann, Sabine (23 May 2023). "Judentum (19. Jahrhundert)". Historisches Lexikon Bayerns (in German). Bavarian State Ministry of Science and the Arts.
- Weber, Leo (2008). "Joseph von Utzschneider and Joseph von Fraunhofer at the former Benedictine monastery of Benediktbeuern, 1805–1818" (PDF). Fraunhofer in Benediktbeuern: Glassworks and Workshop. Munich: Fraunhofer-Gesellschaft. pp. 32–39.
