= Micrometer =

Micrometer can mean:

- Micrometer (device), used for accurate measurements by means of a calibrated screw
- Micrometre, a millionth of a metre
