= Pierre-Louis Guinand =

Swiss lens maker (1748–1824)

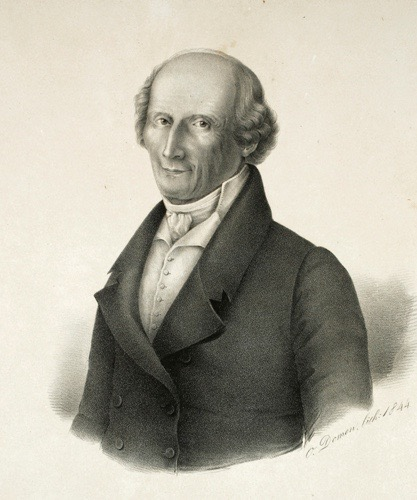
- Lithograph by Étienne-Ovide Domon (1844)
- Born: 20 April 1748; La Sagne, Principality of Neuchâtel
- Died: 13 February 1824 (aged 75); Les Brenets, Principality of Neuchâtel
- Spouses: Élisabeth Bourquin (née Jacot) (m. 1770; died 1771); Marie-Madelaine Jean-Richard-dit-Bressel (m. 1771; died 1781); Marie-Anne Masson (née Jeannot) (m. 1783; div. 1798); Rosalie Bouverat (m. 1806)
- Scientific career
- Fields: Carpenter; watchmaker; optician

Pierre-Louis Guinand (1748–1824) was a Swiss lens maker, who in the late 1700s came up with a breakthrough for making better quality and larger glass, and in time went on to teach a young Fraunhofer at Joseph von Utzschneider's glassworks, and eventually started his own optical glass works. Guinand would supply glass for the Paris Observatory telescopes and also Cauchoix. He was a pioneer in the manufacture of optical glass for microscopes, telescopes, glasses and other optical instruments.

== See also ==
- Markree Observatory#Pierre-Louis Guinand

== Bibliography ==
- King, Henry C. (1979). The History of the Telescope. New York, NY: Dover Publications, Inc. pp. 176–9, 188–9, 191–2, 196, 204, 252. ISBN 978-0-486-23893-7.
