= Georg Merz =

Bavarian optician (1793–1867)

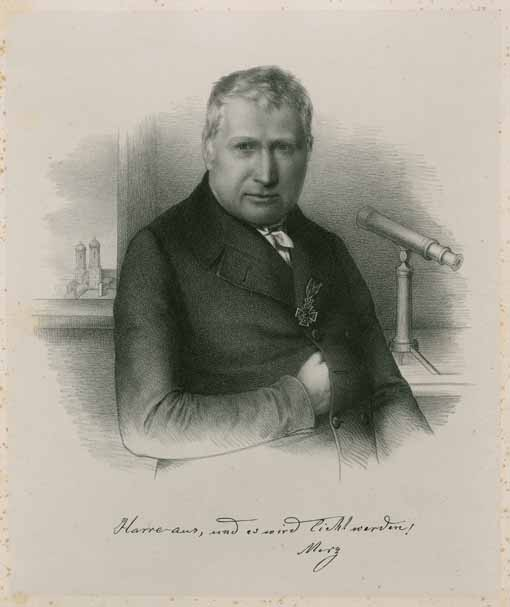
- portrait of Georg Merz
- Born: 26 January 1793; Bichl, Bad Tölz-Wolfratshausen, Bavaria
- Died: 12 January 1867 (aged 73); Munich, Kingdom of Bavaria
- Occupation: optician
- Known for: Merz astronomical telescopes

Georg Merz (26 January 1793 – 12 January 1867) was a Bavarian optician and manufacturer of astronomical telescopes and other optical instruments.

== Life ==
Merz was born on 26 January 1793 in Bichl, in Bad Tölz-Wolfratshausen, now in Bavaria, Germany. At the age of 15 he went to work in the glassworks recently set up by Joseph von Utzschneider in the nearby deconsecrated monastery of Benediktbeuern. There he became the assistant of Joseph Fraunhofer. From 1826, when Fraunhofer died, Merz was in charge of the optical division of the business. On the death of von Utzschneider in 1839 Merz, in partnership with Joseph Mahler, bought the firm. After Mahler's death he ran the business in partnership with his sons Ludwig and Sigmund. When Ludwig died in 1858 the name was changed to G. & S. Merz.

Georg Merz died in Munich on 12 January 1867. In 1882 the firm passed to Jacob and Matthias Merz, Sigmund's cousins, and in 1884 the Benediktbeuern works was closed. The company moved to Munich, and closed in 1903.

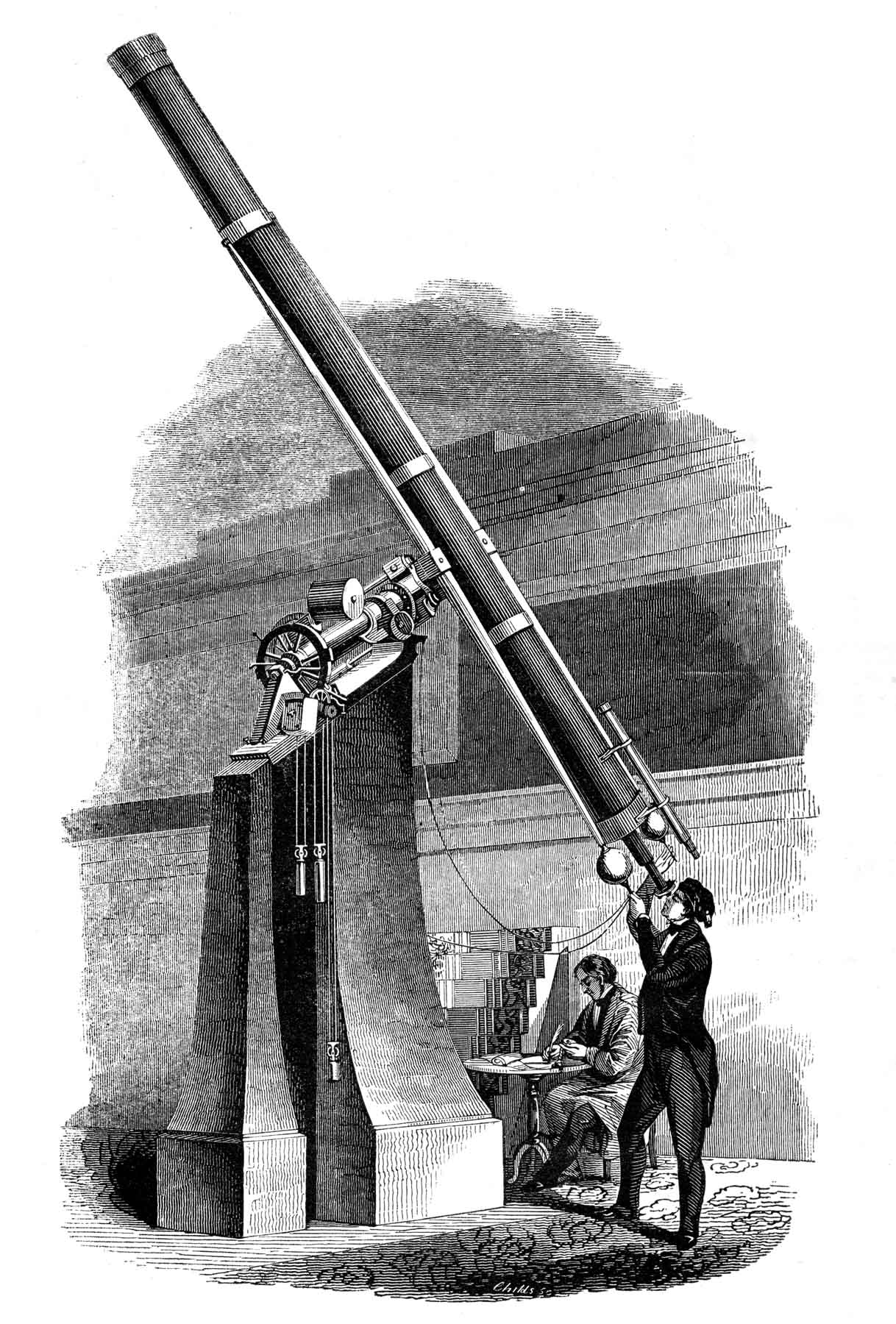
Illustration of the 11 inch "Merz and Mahler" refracting telescope (from "Smith's Illustrated Astronomy" 1848), Cincinnati Observatory

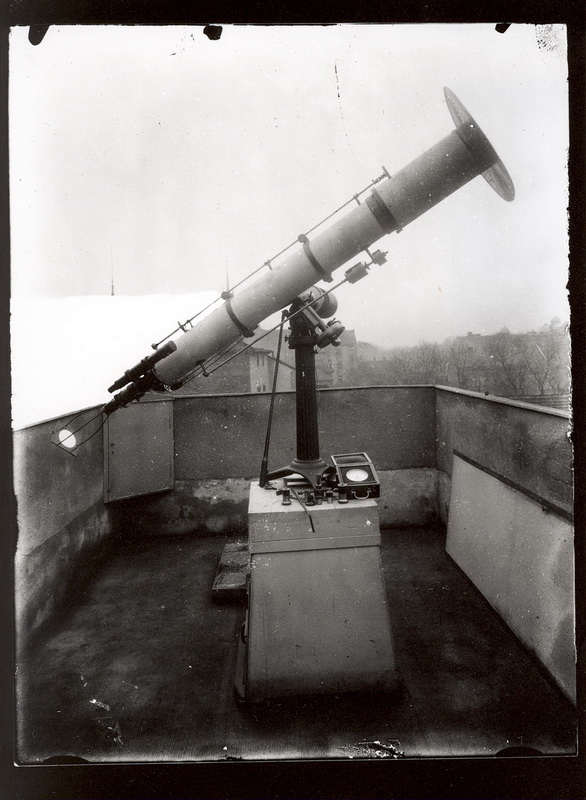
Refraktor Merz 160/1790 at the baron Artur Krause's Observatory in Pardubice, 1912-1930

== Telescopes ==
- The 1845 Merz und Mahler 11″ refractor at the Cincinnati Observatory
- The 1847 15″ Harvard Great Refractor at Harvard College Observatory
- The 1839 Merz und Mahler 15″ refractor at Pulkovo Observatory
- The 1838 Merz 6″ (160 mm) refractor at Leiden Observatory
- The Yellow House Observatory in Dover, MA
- 12½″ Merz refractor telescope at the Royal Observatory, Greenwich
- 5″ (135 mm) G. & S. Merz equatorial refractor telescope at the Astronomical Observatory of Capodimonte, Naples, Italy
- 8.05″ (218 mm) Merz refractor telescope at the Brera Astronomical Observatory, Italy
- The 6.75" (17 cm) Vince Refractor at Bayfordbury Observatory uses a Merz lens manufactured in 1860
- The 5.9″ (150 mm) refractor at the Round Tower Observatory uses a G. & S. Merz lens
- Georg Merz and Sons, vintage 7¼″ refracting telescope at the Sydney Observatory
- Georg Merz and Sons, vintage refracting telescope at the Quito Astronomical Observatory
- An equatorial mounted achromatic refractor from his firm was used in discovery of Neptune.
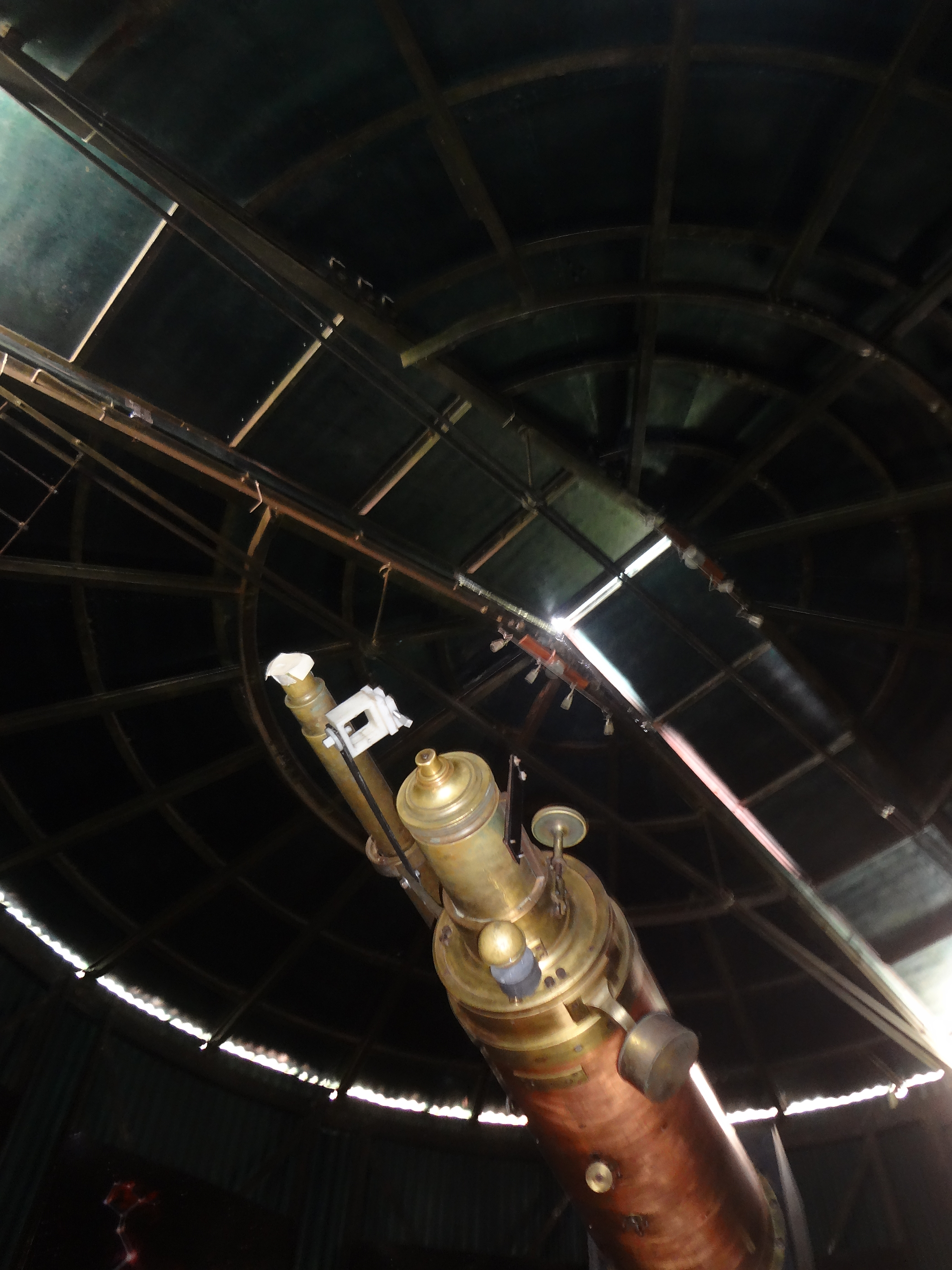
An 1875 Merz Telescope at the Quito Astronomical Observatory
