= Georg Friedrich von Reichenbach =

German scientific instrument maker (1771–1826)

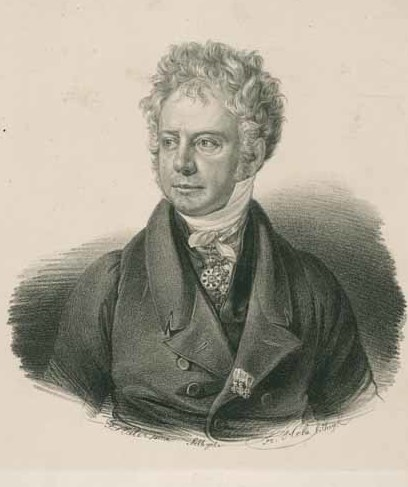
- By Friedrich Hohe after Joseph Karl Stieler (c. 1825)
- Born: 24 August 1771; Durlach, Baden, Holy Roman Empire
- Died: 21 May 1826 (aged 53); Munich, Germany
- Occupation: Scientific instrument maker

Georg Friedrich von Reichenbach (24 August 1771 – 21 May 1826) was a German scientific instrument maker.

== Early life ==
Reichenbach's father was a master mechanic, and a master cannon-borer, who moved to Mannheim when Reichenbach was two, and became manager of the cannon-boring works there. At 14 Georg was admitted to the Military School at Mannheim where he got to know the astronomer at the Mannheim Observatory. He received a knowledge of mathematical instruments and was inspired to try to construct similar instruments in his father's workshop. The Director of the Observatory sent a sextant made by Reichenbach to Count Rumford.

When he was 19, Reichenbach received a grant of 500 gulden for a journey to London, and introductions to the engineers James Watt and Matthew Boulton. Reichenbach's first visit to England lasted from 1 June 1791 to January 1792, when he returned home for a short time before returning to England. He made drawings of Watt's steam engine despite Watt's attempts to keep it secret from him and also worked as an engineer in English ironworks and studied English instrument making.

He returned home in May 1793 and attempted improvements in the military workshops in Mannheim and Munich, with the help of his father.

== Instrument making ==
In 1796 he moved to Munich where he began making his famous scientific instruments, including a dividing engine, in between carrying out military work, which included the invention of a breech-loading rifle which however did not prove popular.

In 1804, with Joseph Liebherr and Joseph von Utzschneider, he founded an instrument making business in Munich and from 1807 onwards he was occupied more and more with the technical problems involved in making scientific instruments, in 1809 establishing with Joseph Fraunhofer and Utzschneider, optical works at Benediktbeuern, which were later moved to Munich in 1823.

In 1811 resigned from the army to devote his time to his scientific work and in 1814 withdrew from both of the companies he had been involved with, founding with T. L. Ertel a new optical business, from which he retired in 1821, when he obtained an engineering appointment under the Bavarian government. He died at Munich on 21 May 1826. He is buried in the Alter Südfriedhof in Munich.

== Transit circle ==
Reichenbach's principal achievement was the introduction into observatories of the meridian or transit circle, which combined the transit and the mural circle into one instrument. This had already been done by Ole Rømer in around 1704, but the idea had not been adopted by anyone else, except in the transit circle constructed by Edward Troughton for Stephen Groombridge in 1806. The transit circle in the form given it by Reichenbach had one finely divided circle attached to one end of the horizontal axis and was read by four verniers on an "alidade circle," the unaltered position of which was tested by a spirit level. The instrument came almost at once into universal use on the continent of Europe (the first one was made for F. W. Bessel in 1819), but in England the mural circle and transit instrument were not superseded for many years.
