= Elton's quadrant =

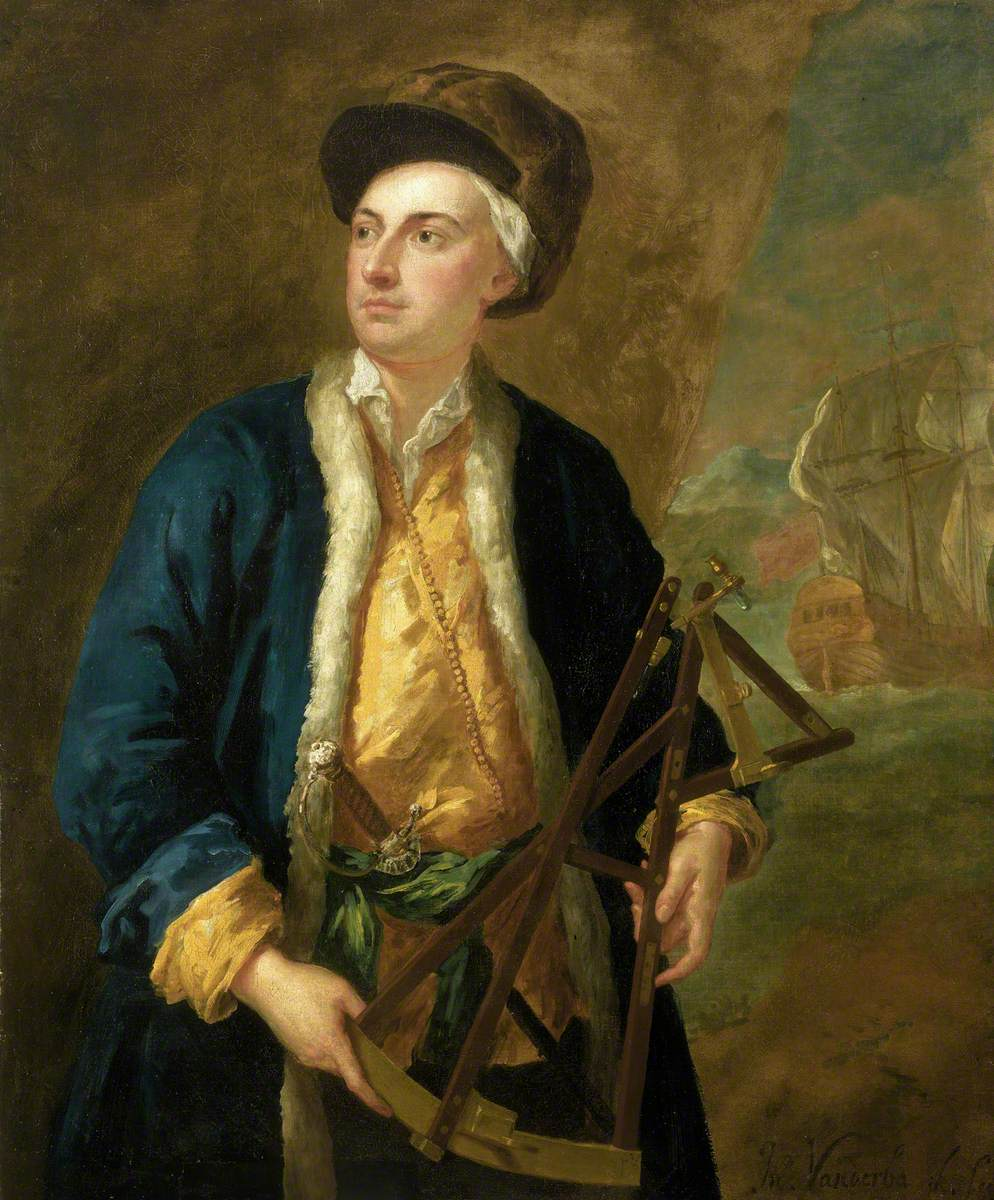
A portrait of a sea captain holding an Elton's quadrant by John Vanderbank. The captain depicted is possibly Elton himself.

An Elton's quadrant is a derivative of the Davis quadrant. It adds an index arm and artificial horizon to the instrument, and was invented by English sea captain John Elton, who patented his design in 1728 and published details of the instrument in the Philosophical Transactions of the Royal Society in 1732.

== Construction ==
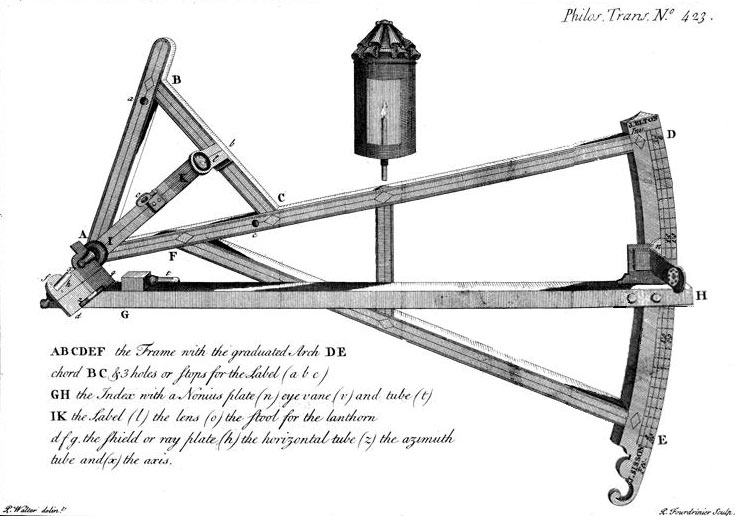
Drawing of Elton's Quadrant. From Philosophical Transactions of the Royal Society, No. 423, Vol 37, 1731-1732. This instrument is derived from the Davis quadrant, adding an index arm with spirit levels to use as an artificial horizon. The instrument is signed J. Sisson fecit - Jonathan Sisson made the instrument as drawn.

This instrument clearly reflects the shape and features of the Davis quadrant. The significant differences are the change in the upper arc to a simple triangular frame and the addition of an index arm. The triangular frame at the top spans 60° as did the arc on the backstaff. The main graduated arc subtends 30° as in the backstaff. The 30° arc is graduated in degrees and sixths of a degree, that is, at ten-minute intervals.

The sighting vane of the backstaff is replaced with a sight (called an eye vane) mounted on the end of the index arm.

The index arm includes a nonius to allow reading the large scale with ten divisions between the graduations on the scale. This provides the navigator with the ability to read the scale to the nearest minute of arc. The index arm has a spirit level to allow the navigator to ensure that the index is horizontal even when he cannot see the horizon.

The instrument has a horizon vane like a Davis quadrant, but Elton refers to it as the shield or ray vane. The shield is attached to the label. The label is an arm that extends from the centre of the arc to the outside of the upper triangle and can be set to one of the three positions in the triangle (in the diagram, it appears to bisect the triangle as it is set to the centre or 30° position). At the upper end of the label is a Flamsteed glass or lens.

The three set positions allow the instrument to read 0° to 30°, 30° to 60° or 60° to 90°. The lens projects an image of the Sun rather than a shadow of the Sun on the shield. This provides an image even when the sky is hazy or lightly overcast. In addition, at the mid-span of the label there is a mounting point for a lantern to be used during nocturnal observations.

There are two spirit levels on the shield. One, called the azimuth tube, ensures that the plane of the instrument is vertical. The other is perpendicular to the shield and will indicate when the plane of the shield is vertical and the label is horizontal.

== Usage ==
=== Solar altitude by backsight ===
For measuring the altitude of the Sun, the Elton's quadrant can be used in the same manner as a Davis quadrant. However, with the artificial horizon, the eye vane is not required to be used.

Hold the instrument in a comfortable manner with the arc towards the Sun. Set the label so that the Sun's image is projected on the shield at the hole with the index arm roughly horizontal. Move the index arm so that the index's spirit level shows the arm is precisely horizontal. This sets the instrument and the angle can be read with the scale and nonius.

=== Stellar altitude by foresight ===
This is a means of measuring altitude of a celestial object that is very different from what can be done with a Davis quadrant. It reveals one of the significant improvements of the Elton's quadrant over the former instrument.

Set the label to a position that will put the object to be measured within the range of the instrument. Observe the object through the eye vane so that the object touches the upper edge of the shield while using the azimuth tube to ensure that the frame is vertical. Move the index arm so that the shield's horizontal tube indicates that the shield is precisely vertical. This sets the instrument and the angle can be read on the arc.

== Significance to navigation ==
The Elton's quadrant is not very well known as a navigation instrument. It was used, though to what degree is not known. Elton had the misfortune to invent his instrument in the same period of time as the octant. In fact, John Hadley published details on his octant prior to Elton's article in the same volume of the Philosophical Transactions (article 37 vs 48).

Given that Elton's quadrant was roughly as complex as an octant in construction, there would not likely be a significant advantage in price. The octant was an easier instrument to use and Hadley had supported the use of artificial horizons on the octant in the form of spirit levels. This would have given no advantage to Elton's instrument. In addition, there were many other instruments competing for the attention of navigators in this period. In the end, the Hadley octant and later sextant took precedence as instruments for navigators.
