= Jacob's staff =

Measurement tool

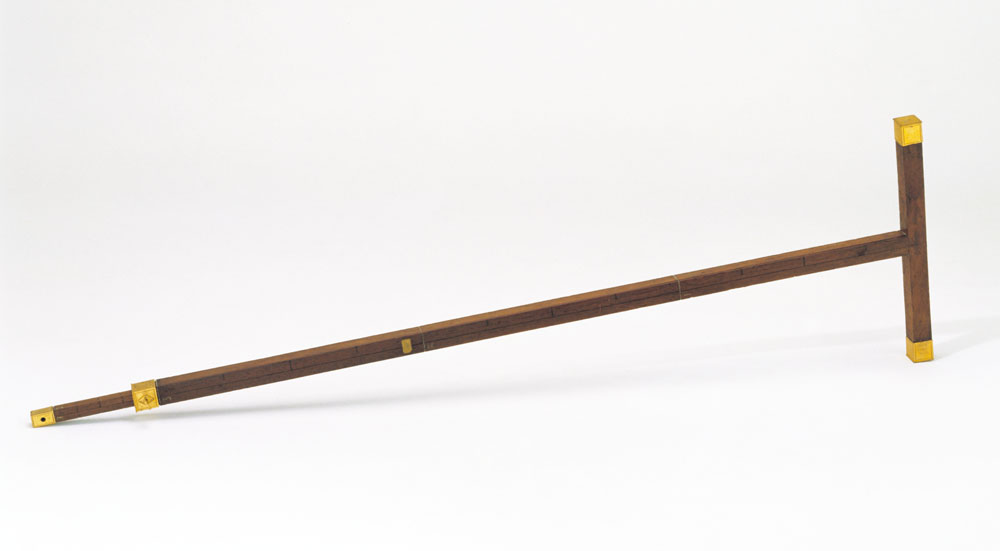
Jacob's staff in the Museo Galileo, Florence

Measuring the height of a star with a Jacob's staff

Jacob's staff is a measuring tool with several variations. It is also known as cross-staff, a ballastella, a fore-staff, a ballestilla, or a balestilha. In its most basic form, a Jacob's staff is a stick or pole with length markings, often with a smaller segment attached perpendicularly. The simplest use of a Jacob's staff is to make qualitative judgements of the height and angle of an object relative to the user of the staff.

Most staffs are much more complicated than that, and usually contain a number of measurement and stabilization features. The two most frequent uses are:

- in astronomy and navigation for a simple device to measure angles, later replaced by the more precise sextants;
- in surveying (and scientific fields that use surveying techniques, such as geology and ecology) for a vertical rod that penetrates or sits on the ground and supports a compass or other instrument.

== Etymology ==
The origin of the name of the instrument is not certain. Some refer to the Biblical patriarch Jacob, specifically in the Book of Genesis (Gen 32:11). It may also take its name after its resemblance to Orion, referred to by the name of Jacob on some medieval star charts. Another possible source is the Pilgrim's staff, the symbol of St James (Jacobus in Latin). The name cross staff simply comes from its cruciform shape.

== In astronomy and navigation ==
In navigation the instrument is also called a cross-staff and was used to determine angles, for instance the angle between the horizon and Polaris or the sun to determine a vessel's latitude, or the angle between the top and bottom of an object to determine the distance to said object if its height is known, or the height of the object if its distance is known, or the horizontal angle between two visible locations to determine one's point on a map.

The Jacob's staff, when used for astronomical observations, was also referred to as a radius astronomicus. With the demise of the cross-staff, in the modern era the name "Jacob's staff" is applied primarily to the device used to provide support for surveyor's instruments.

=== History ===
The original Jacob's staff was developed as a single pole device, in the 14th century, that was used in making astronomical measurements. It was first described by the French-Jewish rabbi and mathematician Levi ben Gerson (Gersonides) of Provence, in his "Book of the Wars of the Lord" (translated in Latin as well as Hebrew). He used a Hebrew name for the staff that translates to "Revealer of Profundities", while the term "Jacob's staff" was used by his Christian contemporaries. Its invention was likely due to fellow French-Jewish astronomer Jacob ben Makir, who also lived in Provence in the same period. Attribution to 15th century Austrian astronomer Georg Purbach is less likely, because Purbach was not born until 1423. (Such attributions may refer to a different instrument with the same name.) Its origins may be traced to the Chaldeans around 400 BCE.

Although it has become quite accepted that Gersonides first described Jacob's staff, the British Sinologist Joseph Needham theorizes that the Song dynasty Chinese scientist Shen Kuo (1031–1095), in his Dream Pool Essays of 1088, described a Jacob's staff. Shen was an antiquarian interested in ancient objects; after he unearthed an ancient crossbow-like device from a home's garden in Jiangsu, he realized it had a sight with a graduated scale that could be used to measure the heights of distant mountains, likening it to how mathematicians measure heights by using right-angle triangles. He wrote that when one viewed the whole breadth of a mountain with it, the distance on the instrument was long; when viewing a small part of the mountainside, the distance was short; this, he wrote, was due to the cross piece that had to be pushed further away from the eye, while the graduation started from the further end. Needham does not mention any practical application of this observation.

During the medieval European Renaissance, the Dutch mathematician and surveyor Adriaan Metius developed his own Jacob's staff; Dutch mathematician Gemma Frisius made improvements to this instrument. In the 15th century, the German mathematician Johannes Müller (called Regiomontanus) made the instrument popular in geodesic and astronomical measurements.

=== Construction ===
A Jacob's staff, from John Sellers' Practical Navigation (1672)

In the original form of the cross-staff, the pole or main staff was marked with graduations for length. The cross-piece (BC in the drawing to the right), also called the transom or transversal, slides up and down on the main staff. On older instruments, the ends of the transom were cut straight across. Newer instruments had brass fittings on the ends, with holes in the brass for observation. (In marine archaeology, these fittings are often the only components of a cross-staff that survive.)

It was common to provide several transoms, each with a different range of angles it would measure; three transoms were common. In later instruments, separate transoms were switched in favour of just one with pegs to indicate the ends. These pegs were mounted in one of several pairs of holes symmetrically located on either side of the transom. This provided the same capability with fewer parts. The transom on Frisius' version had a sliding vane on the transom as an end point.

=== Usage ===
The user places one end of the main staff against their cheek, just below the eye. By sighting the horizon at the end of the lower part of the transom (or through the hole in the brass fitting) [B], then adjusting the cross arm on the main arm until the sun is at the other end of the transom [C], the altitude can be determined by reading the position of the cross arm on the scale on the main staff. This value was converted to an angular measurement by looking up the value in a table.

=== Cross-staff for navigation ===
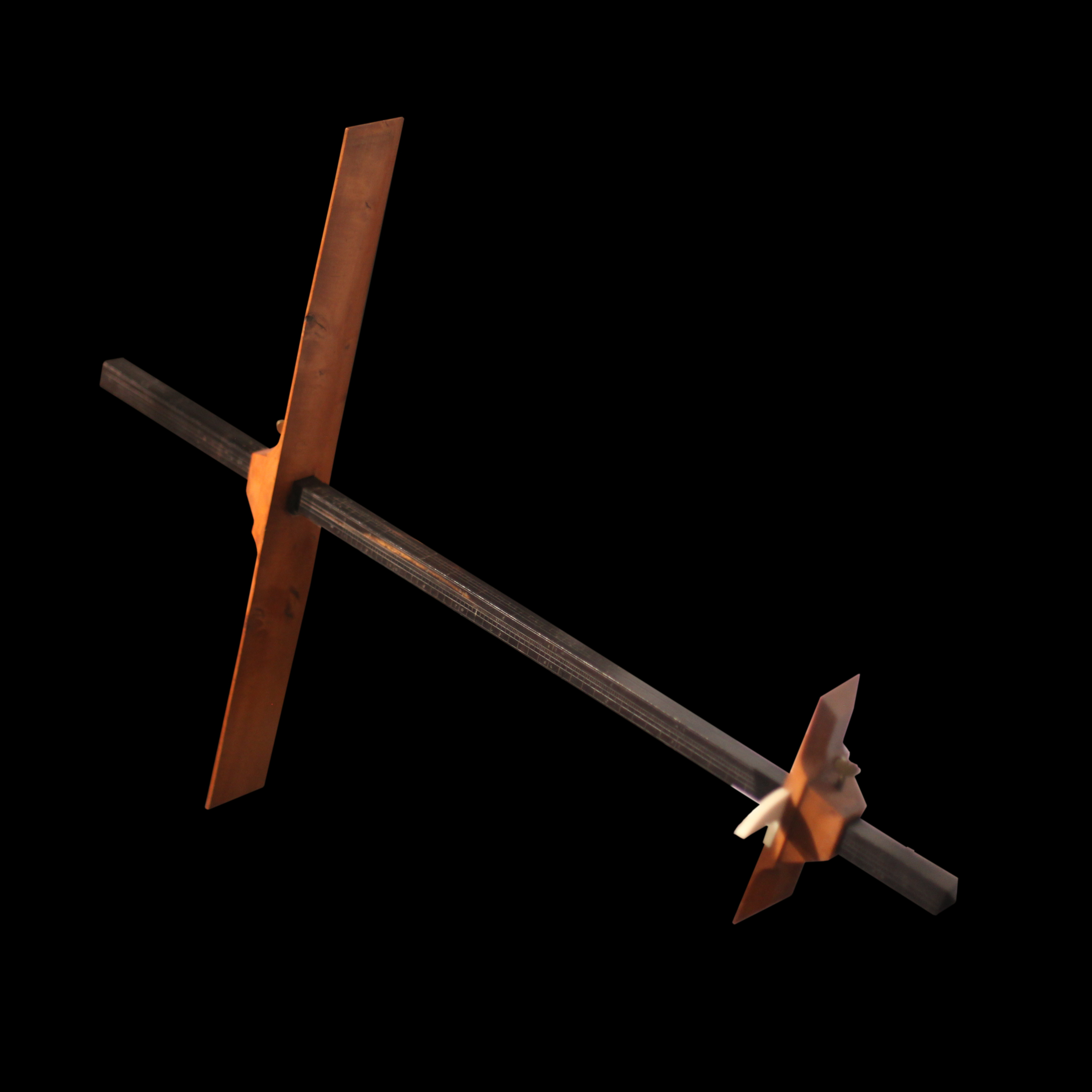
Nautical cross-staff dated 1776, on display at Musée national de la Marine, Paris.

The original version was not reported to be used at sea, until the Age of Discoveries. Its use was reported by João de Lisboa in his Treatise on the Nautical Needle of 1514. Johannes Werner suggested the cross-staff be used at sea in 1514 and improved instruments were introduced for use in navigation. John Dee introduced it to England in the 1550s. In the improved versions, the rod was graduated directly in degrees. This variant of the instrument is not correctly termed a Jacob's staff but is a cross-staff.

The cross-staff was difficult to use. In order to get consistent results, the observer had to position the end of the pole precisely against his cheek. He had to observe the horizon and a star in two different directions while not moving the instrument when he shifted his gaze from one to the other. In addition, observations of the sun required the navigator to look directly at the sun. This could be a uncomfortable exercise and made it difficult to obtain an accurate altitude for the sun. Mariners took to mounting smoked-glass to the ends of the transoms to reduce the glare of the sun.

A cross-staff appears on the current Seal of New York City, above the sailor. This seal dates from 1915, though a cross-staff is depicted in 17th century versions.

As a navigational tool, this instrument was eventually replaced, first by the backstaff or quadrant, neither of which required the user to stare directly into the sun, and later by the octant and the sextant. Perhaps influenced by the backstaff, some navigators modified the cross-staff to operate more like the former. Vanes were added to the ends of the longest cross-piece and another to the end of the main staff. The instrument was reversed so that the shadow of the upper vane on the cross piece fell on the vane at the end of the staff. The navigator held the instrument so that he would view the horizon lined up with the lower vane and the vane at the end of the staff. By aligning the horizon with the shadow of the sun on the vane at the end of the staff, the elevation of the sun could be determined. This actually increased the accuracy of the instrument, as the navigator no longer had to position the end of the staff precisely on his cheek.

Another variant of the cross-staff was a spiegelboog, invented in 1660 by the Dutchman, Joost van Breen.

Ultimately, the cross-staff could not compete with the backstaff in many countries. In terms of handling, the backstaff was found to be easier to use. However, it has been proven by several authors that in terms of accuracy, the cross-staff was superior to the backstaff. Backstaves were no longer allowed on board Dutch East India Company vessels as per 1731, with octants not permitted until 1748.

== In surveying ==
In surveying, the term jacob staff refers to a monopod, a single straight rod or staff made of nonferrous material, pointed and metal-clad at the bottom for penetrating the ground. It also has a screw base and occasionally a ball joint on the mount, and is used for supporting a compass, transit, or other instrument.

The term cross-staff may also have a different meaning in the history of surveying. While the astronomical cross-staff was used in surveying for measuring angles, two other devices referred to as a cross-staff were also employed.

1. Cross-head, cross-sight, surveyor's cross or cross - a drum or box shaped device mounted on a pole. It had two sets of mutually perpendicular sights. This device was used by surveyors to measure offsets. Sophisticated versions had a compass and spirit levels on the top. The French versions were frequently eight-sided rather than round.
2. Optical square - an improved version of the cross-head, the optical square used two silvered mirrors at 45° to each other. This permitted the surveyor to see along both axes of the instrument at once.

In the past, many surveyor's instruments were used on a Jacob's staff. These include:

- Cross-head, cross-sight, surveyor's cross or cross
- Graphometer
- Circumferentor
- Holland circle
- Miner's dial
- Optical square
- Surveyor's sextant
- Surveyor's target
- Abney level

Some devices, such as the modern optical targets for laser-based surveying, are still in common use on a Jacob's staff, called nowadays a surveying pole.

== In geology ==
In geology, the Jacob's staff is mainly used to measure stratigraphic thicknesses in the field, especially when bedding is not visible or unclear (e.g., covered outcrop) and when due to the configuration of an outcrop, the apparent and real thicknesses of beds diverge therefore making the use of a tape measure difficult. There is a certain level of error to be expected when using this tool, due to the lack of an exact reference mean for measuring stratigraphic thickness. High-precision designs include a laser able to slide vertically along the staff and to rotate on a plane parallel to bedding.

== See also ==
- Backstaff
- Cross of St James
- Pilgrim's staff
- Tacheometry
- As a symbol in Scouting: 5th World Scout Jamboree
