= John Elton =

English sea captain, shipbuilder and merchant

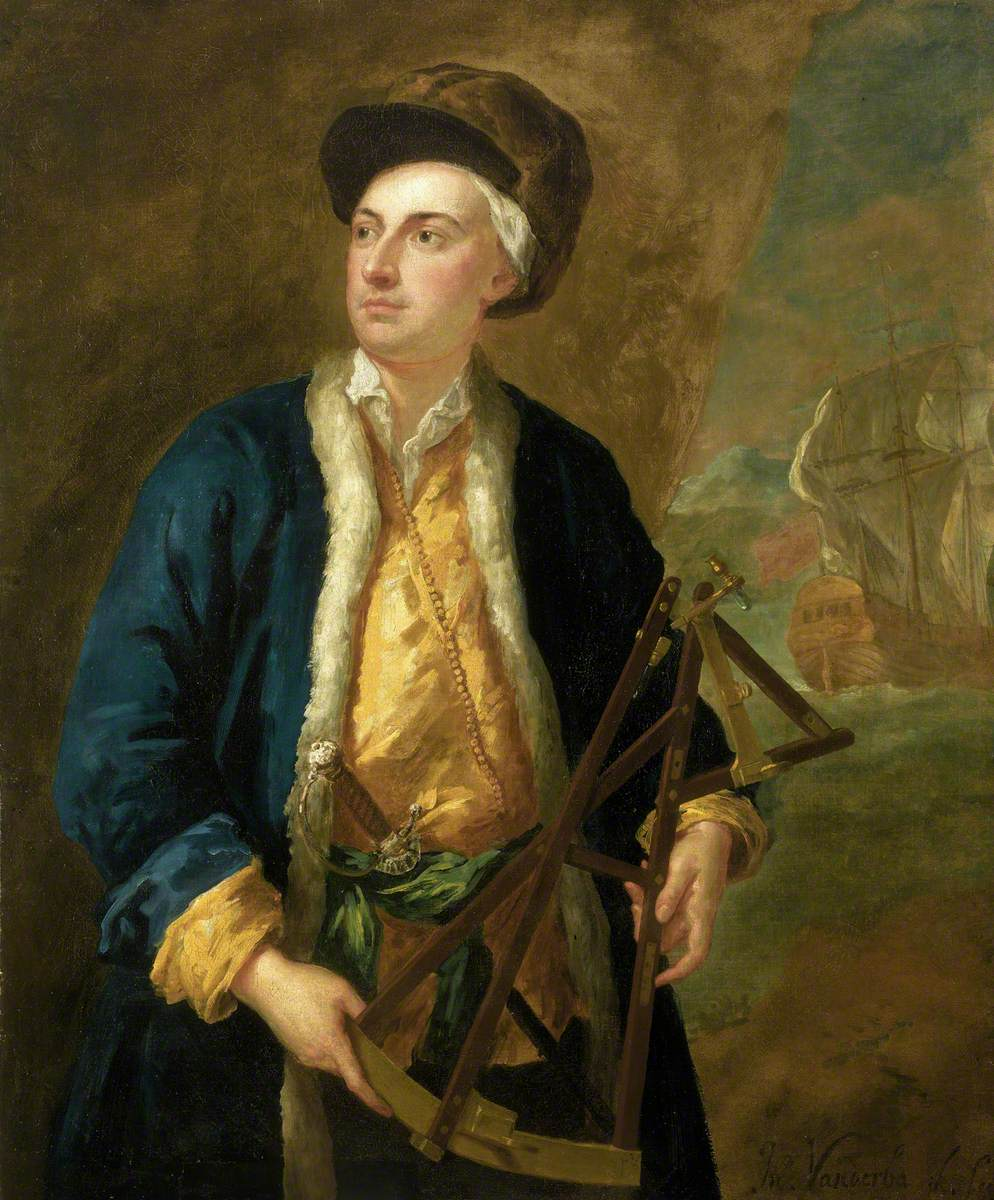
A portrait of a sea captain holding an Elton's quadrant by John Vanderbank. The captain depicted is possibly Elton himself.

John Elton (d. 1751) was an English sea captain, shipbuilder and merchant best known for inventing Elton's quadrant and serving the shah of Iran, Nader Shah.

== Life ==
John Elton was the inventor of Elton's quadrant who patented his design in 1728 and published details of the instrument in the Philosophical Transactions of the Royal Society in 1732. He was sent by the Russian government in 1735 to assist in the Orenburg expedition in the rank of a sea captain. During this mission he was sent to explore Lake Aral, but was hindered by the Tartars from reaching the lake. He then employed himself in surveying the south-eastern frontier of Russia, particularly part of the basins of the Kama, Volga, and Jaik.

Returning to Saint Petersburg in January 1738, he took umbrage at not obtaining promotion and quit the Russian service. In the same year he proposed to some of the British factors at St. Petersburg to carry on a trade through Russia into Iran and central Asia by way of the Caspian Sea. Associating himself with Mungo Graeme, a young Scot, he obtained credit for a small cargo of goods suitable for Khiva and Bokhara. They left Moscow on 19 March 1738-9, and, proceeding down the Volga from Nijni Novgorod to Astrakhan, embarked on the Caspian for Karagansk. At Karagansk they received such unpromising accounts of the state of the steppe that they resolved to continue their voyage to Rasht in Iran.

Elton was successful in finding a good market and in obtaining a decree from the shah granting them liberty to trade throughout Iran, and extraordinary privileges. He persuaded the Russia Company to take up his scheme, and in 1741 an Act of Parliament sanctioning the trade was passed. In 1742 two ships were built on the Caspian, and Elton was placed in command of the first completed. These vessels carried the English flag, which, however, Anthony Jenkinson claimed to have first displayed on the Caspian about 1558. The apprehensions of the Russian court were, however, excited by the intelligence that Elton was building ships on the Caspian, after the European fashion, for the Iranian sovereign, Nader Shah.

On receipt of the intelligence the Russia Company despatched Jonas Hanway to make inquiry concerning Elton's proceedings. Hanway arrived at Rasht on 3 December 1743 and found Elton earnestly pressing forward the construction of Iranian vessels. The Russian court, indignant at Elton's action, refused to countenance the Caspian trade and ruined the expectations of the Russia Company. In the meanwhile Elton had constructed a ship of twenty guns for Nader Shah, of which he was placed in command. He was appointed admiral of the Caspian, and received orders to oblige all Russian vessels on those waters to salute his flag. During his service to Nader, he also twice transported supplies to Baku, and surveyed the southern coast of Dagestan as a preparation for another episode in his Dagestan campaign.

The Russia Company, in October 1744, vainly ordered him to return to England, Elton replying by the transmission of a decree from Nader Shah, dated 19 November 1745, forbidding him to quit Iran. Offers of a pension from the Russia Company and a post in the navy from the British government were equally ineffectual. Disregarding the injury which he was inflicting on the Russia Company, he maintained that a British subject may with loyalty take service with any foreign potentate on friendly terms with Britain, and that he was under no obligations to Russia. On the death of Nader in 1747 he narrowly escaped assassination, but found protection from several of the Iranian princes. Finally, however, in April 1751, he espoused the cause of Mohammad Hasan Khan Qajar, and was besieged in his house at Gilan by the rival faction. He was subsequently taken prisoner by the governor of Gilan, Hajj Jamal Fumani, for his unwillingness to protect Rasht against the advancing Qajars. He was later shot dead. A great part of Elton's diary during his first expedition to Iran in 1739 is printed in Jonas Hanway's Historical Account of the British Trade over the Caspian Sea (1754). Lake Elton in south-eastern Russia is probably named after him.

== Sources ==
- This article incorporates text from a publication now in the public domain: Carlyle, Edward Irving (1901). "Elton, John (d.1751)". In Lee, Sidney (ed.). Dictionary of National Biography (1st supplement). London: Smith, Elder & Co.
- Carlyle, E. I.; Searight, S. "Elton, John (d. 1751)". Oxford Dictionary of National Biography (online ed.). Oxford University Press. doi:10.1093/ref:odnb/8770. (Subscription, Wikipedia Library access or UK public library membership required.)
- Perry, John (1998). "ELTON, JOHN". Encyclopaedia Iranica, Vol. VIII, Fasc. 4. pp. 370–371.
