= Bubble octant =

Air navigation instrument

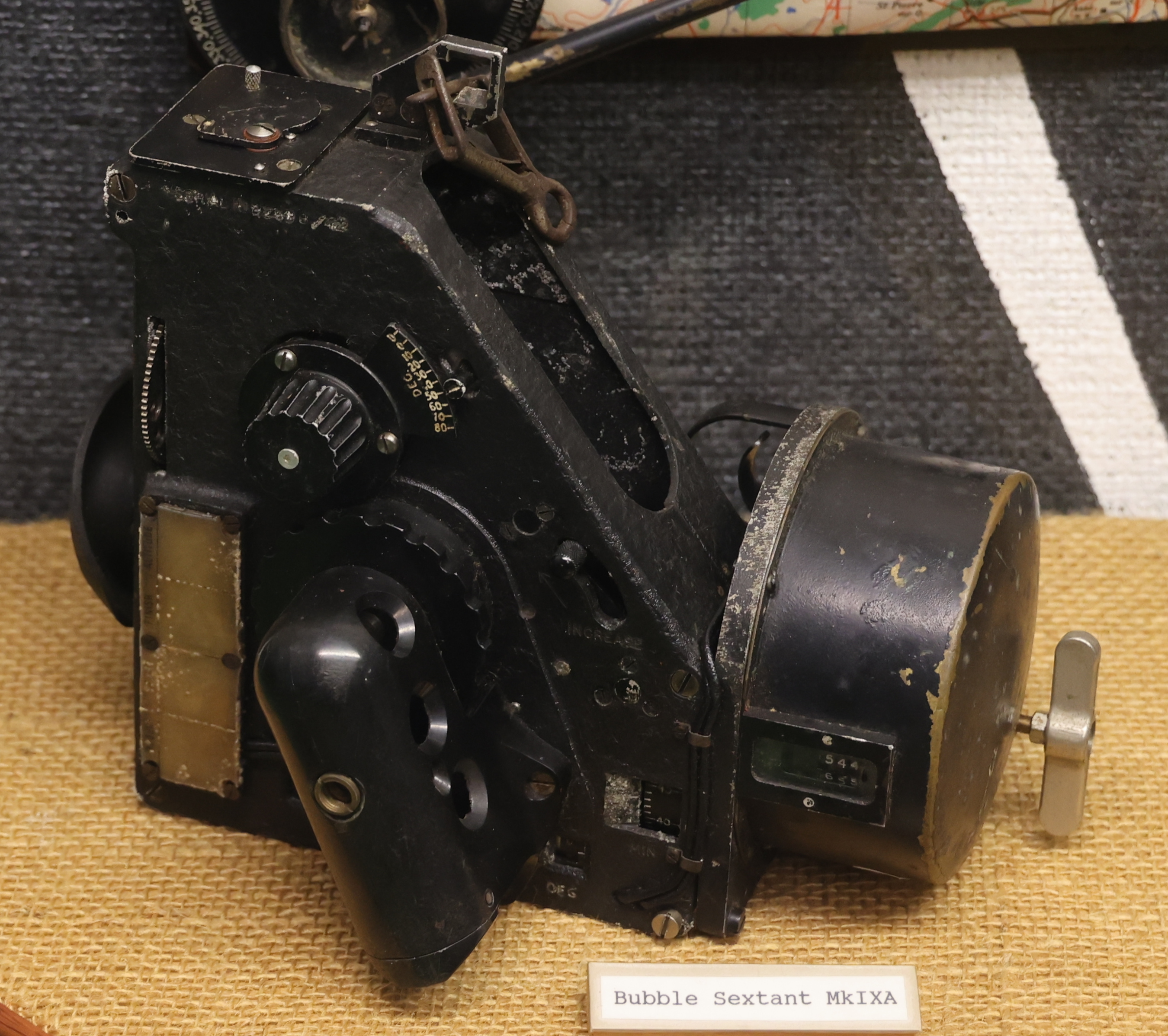
A MkIXA Bubble sextant

The bubble octant and bubble sextant are air navigation instruments. Although an instrument may be called a "bubble sextant", it may actually be a bubble octant.

== Use ==
Ships had long used sextants for navigation, but sextants had problems in aircraft navigation. A ship at sea is on a relatively flat surface and can use the horizon to measure the altitude of celestial objects. However, an aircraft may not have the sea's horizon as a flat reference surface. It may be flying over land where the horizon is formed by mountains of unknown height.

A solution to the problem was to use a bubble to determine the reference plane. The bubble in an airplane is subject to the plane's acceleration. If the plane is in sharp turn, the bubble will be displaced. Consequently, when the navigator is using a bubble sextant, the pilot tries to fly the plane straight and level.

Even when flying straight, a plane is subject to acceleration from air density and wind changes. Consequently, use of a bubble octant requires many readings be taken and then averaged for a more accurate result. Some bubble octants have accessories to make the averaging simpler.

== Development ==
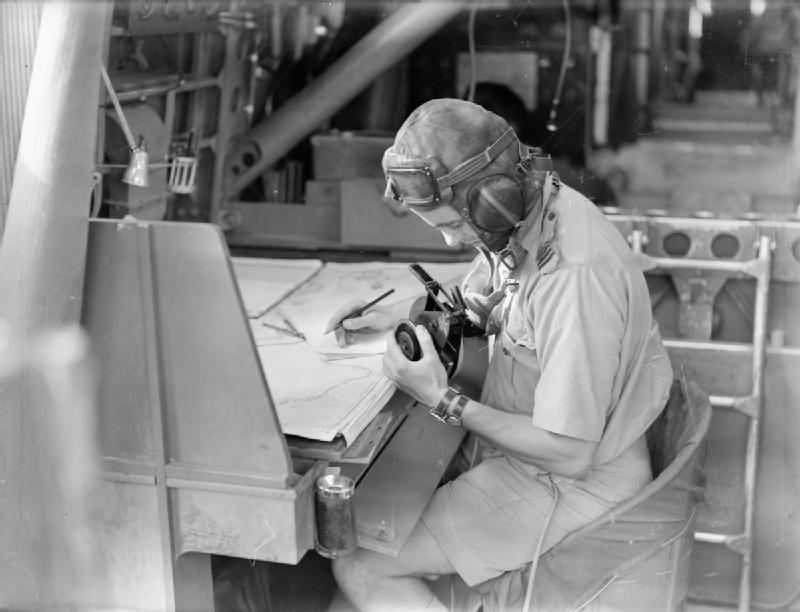
Mk VIII Bubble sextant in use on a Short Sunderland

Isaac Newton developed the quadrant. The octant was a further improvement. It could measure altitudes of up to 90° above the horizon. The first bubble instruments, which were developed by Gago Coutinho, were bubble sextants that copied the features of an ordinary sextant.

== See also ==
- Amelia Earhart. Her navigator, Fred Noonan, used a bubble octant.
- Eddie Rickenbacker. A damaged bubble octant caused a navigation error, resulting in a ditching at sea.
