= Thomas Godfrey (inventor) =

American glazier, mathematician, astronomer and inventor (1704–1749)

- Born: January 10, 1704; Bristol Township, Philadelphia County, Pennsylvania
- Died: December 1749 (aged 45)
- Resting place: Laurel Hill Cemetery, Philadelphia, Pennsylvania, U.S.
- Occupations: Astronomer, glazier, inventor, mathematician, plumber, publisher

Thomas Godfrey (January 10, 1704 – December 1749) was a glazier and self-taught mathematician and astronomer in the Pennsylvania Colony, who invented the octant in 1730. A similar octant was also independently invented about the same time by John Hadley in London with Hadley receiving the greater share of the credit for development.

He published almanacs and contributed essays on mathematics, astronomy and general topics to the Pennsylvania Gazette and Pennsylvania Journal. He assisted the Welsh surveyor Lewis Evans in conducting astronomical observations to correct the longitude of Philadelphia on maps published by Evans.

He was friends with Benjamin Franklin and a founding member of the Junto club, which was the precursor of the American Philosophical Society. He served as a director of the Library Company of Philadelphia and was a member of American Philosophical Society with the title "mathematician".

== Early life ==
Godfrey was born January 10, 1704, to Joseph and Catherine Godfrey on the family farm in Bristol Township, Philadelphia County, Pennsylvania. His father died when he was 1 years old and he inherited the family farm at age 21. He moved to Philadelphia and worked as a plumber and a glazier. He installed the glass in Philadelphia's State House, now Independence Hall. He was employed at the estate of James Logan who encouraged Godfrey to pursue mathematics and science. He became a deist.

== Career ==
While working at James Logan's estate, Stenton, Godfrey observed a reflection in a piece of broken glass which prompted the idea for the reflecting quadrant. Godfrey accessed a copy of Isaac Newton's Philosophiæ Naturalis Principia Mathematica in Logan's library to further expand his idea. While challenged by the Latin text, with Logan's support, he was able to learn Latin and apply Newton's theories to his idea.

Godfrey began experiments to develop an improved quadrant for determining latitude for navigation. He carried out much of his work in part of a home he rented from Benjamin Franklin. Godfrey completed development of his octant in 1730 and the accuracy of the device was tested by the captain and first mate of the Trueman on voyages to the West Indies and Newfoundland.

James Logan sent a description of Godfrey's invention to Edmond Halley, the Astronomer Royal in Britain. Logan was surprised to then see an almost identical device described as invented by John Hadley in the Philosophical Transactions of the Royal Society. Hadley received a patent for the octant in 1734 without contest. Godfrey, along with Logan, wrote to the Royal Society to defend his claim that the device was his original invention. The communication including sworn affidavits signed by the Mayor of Philadelphia that Godfrey's octant was crafted by Edmund Woolley of wood in November 1730. The communication also noted that Hadley's nephew was present at an early demonstration of his invention. His claim was denied, but he did receive a cash reward for his work from the Society.

From 1729 to 1736, Godfrey worked as a publisher of almanacs. He also contributed essays on mathematics, astronomy and general topics to the Pennsylvania Gazette and Pennsylvania Journal. He assisted Lewis Evans in conducting astronomical observations to correct the longitude of Philadelphia on maps published by Evans.

Godfrey was a founding member, with Benjamin Franklin, of the Junto club, which was the precursor of the American Philosophical Society. Godfrey was a director of the Library Company of Philadelphia and was a member of American Philosophical Society with the title "mathematician". Franklin described Godfrey at length in his Autobiography:

"A self taught mathematician, great in his way, and afterwards inventor of what is now call'd Hadley's Quadrant. But he knew little out of his way, and was not a pleasing companion, as like most great mathematicians I have met with, he expected unusual precision in every thing he said, or was forever denying or distinguishing upon trifles, to the disturbance of all conversation. He soon left us."

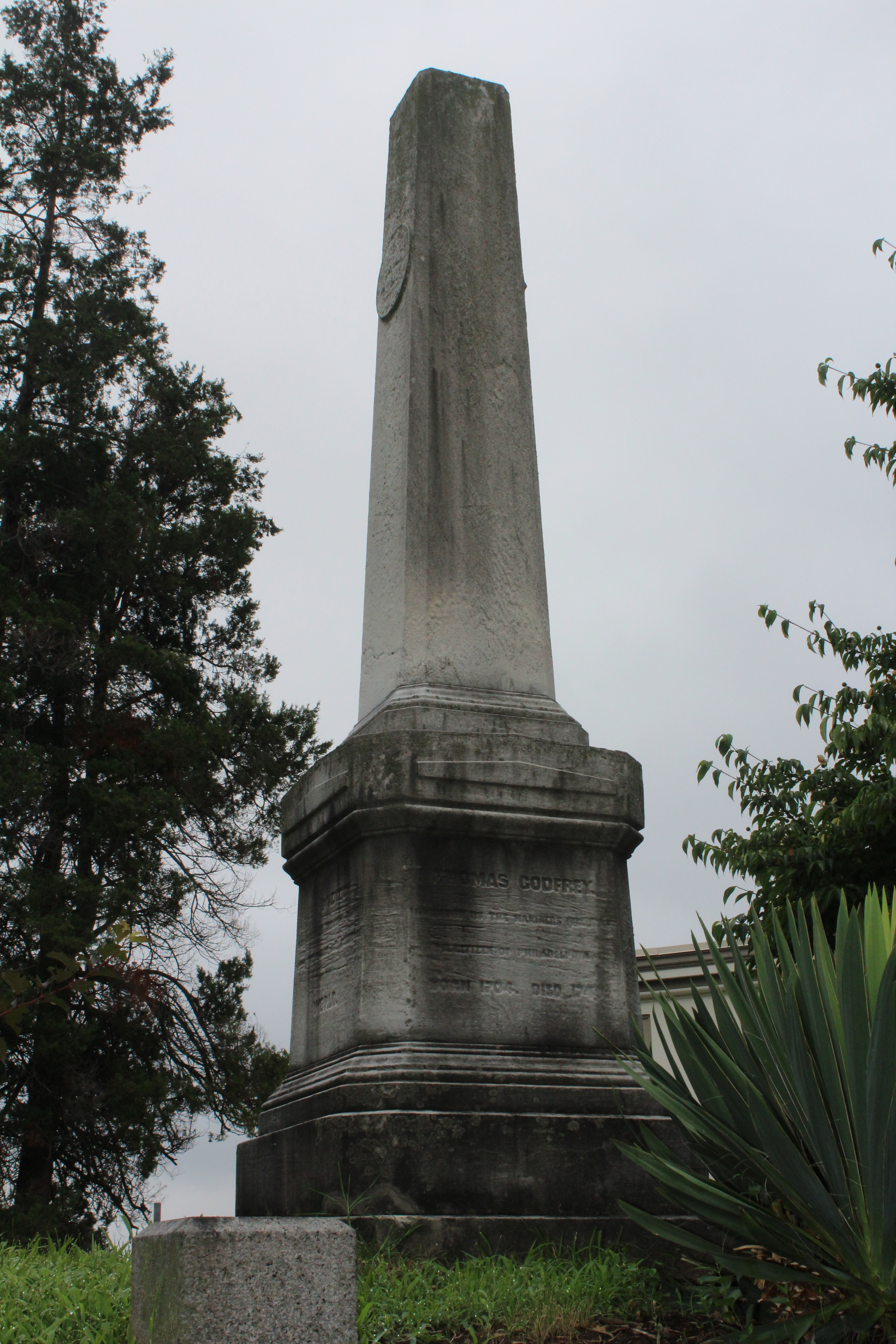
Thomas Godfrey tombstone in Laurel Hill Cemetery

Godfrey died in 1749 at the age of 45. He was originally interred at his farm near Germantown, but over time the grave fell into disrepair. In 1838, John Fanning Watson reinterred the remains of Godfrey, his wife, father and mother to Laurel Hill Cemetery. In 1843, a memorial erected by the Mercantile Library Company of Philadelphia was placed atop their graves.

== Personal life ==
Godfrey was married and had five children. His second son, also Thomas Godfrey, was a poet and published several popular works, including the play The Prince of Parthia.
