= John Hadley =

English mathematician (1682–1744)

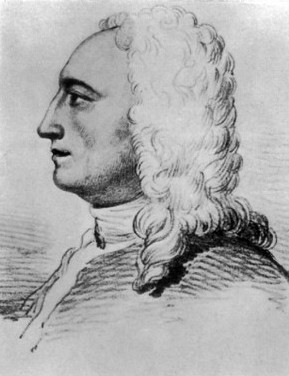
- Born: 16 April 1682; Bloomsbury, London
- Died: 14 February 1744 (aged 61); East Barnet, Hertfordshire
- Known for: Octant

John Hadley (16 April 1682 – 14 February 1744) was an English mathematician, and laid claim to the invention of the octant, two years after Thomas Godfrey claimed the same.

== Biography ==
He was born in Bloomsbury, London the eldest son of George Hadley of Osidge, East Barnet, Hertfordshire and his wife Katherine FitzJames. His younger brother George Hadley became a noted meteorologist.

In 1717 John became a member (and later vice-president) of the Royal Society of London. In 1729 he inherited his father's East Barnet estate.

He died in East Barnet in north London in 1744, and is buried in the local churchyard with other members of his family. He had married Elizabeth, daughter of Thomas Hodges, FRS (former Attorney General of Barbados) and had one child, a son and heir John, born in 1738.

== Work ==
In 1730 Hadley invented the reflecting octant, which could be used to measure the altitude of the sun or other celestial objects above the horizon at sea. A mobile arm carrying a mirror and pivoting on a graduated arc provides a reflected image of the celestial body overlapping the image of the horizon, which is observed directly. If the position of the object on the sky and the time of the observation are known, it is easy for the user to calculate his own latitude. The octant proved extremely valuable for navigation and displaced the use of other instruments such as the Davis quadrant. An American, Thomas Godfrey, independently invented the octant at approximately the same time.

Hadley also developed ways to make precision aspheric and parabolic objective mirrors for reflecting telescopes. In 1721 he showed the first parabolic Newtonian telescope to the Royal Society. This Newtonian, with a 6-inch-diameter (150 mm) primary mirror, compared favorably with the large aerial refracting telescopes of the day. He also made Gregorian telescopes with accurately shaped mirrors.

== Honors ==
Mons Hadley and Rima Hadley on the Moon are named after him. The Oasis Trust Academy in Ponders End in north London is called Oasis Academy Hadley in his honour.

== See also ==
- List of largest optical telescopes in the 18th century
