= Backstaff =

Navigational instrument

The backstaff is a navigational instrument that was used to measure the altitude of a celestial body, in particular the Sun or Moon. When observing the Sun, users kept the Sun to their back (hence the name) and observed the shadow cast by the upper vane on a horizon vane. It was invented by the English navigator John Davis, who described it in his book Seaman's Secrets in 1594.

== Types of backstaffs ==
Backstaff is the name given to any instrument that measures the altitude of the sun by the projection of a shadow. It appears that the idea for measuring the sun's altitude using back observations originated with Thomas Harriot. Many types of instruments evolved from the cross-staff that can be classified as backstaffs. Only the Davis quadrant remains dominant in the history of navigation instruments. Indeed, the Davis quadrant is essentially synonymous with backstaff. However, Davis was neither the first nor the last to design such an instrument and others are considered here as well.

== Davis quadrant ==
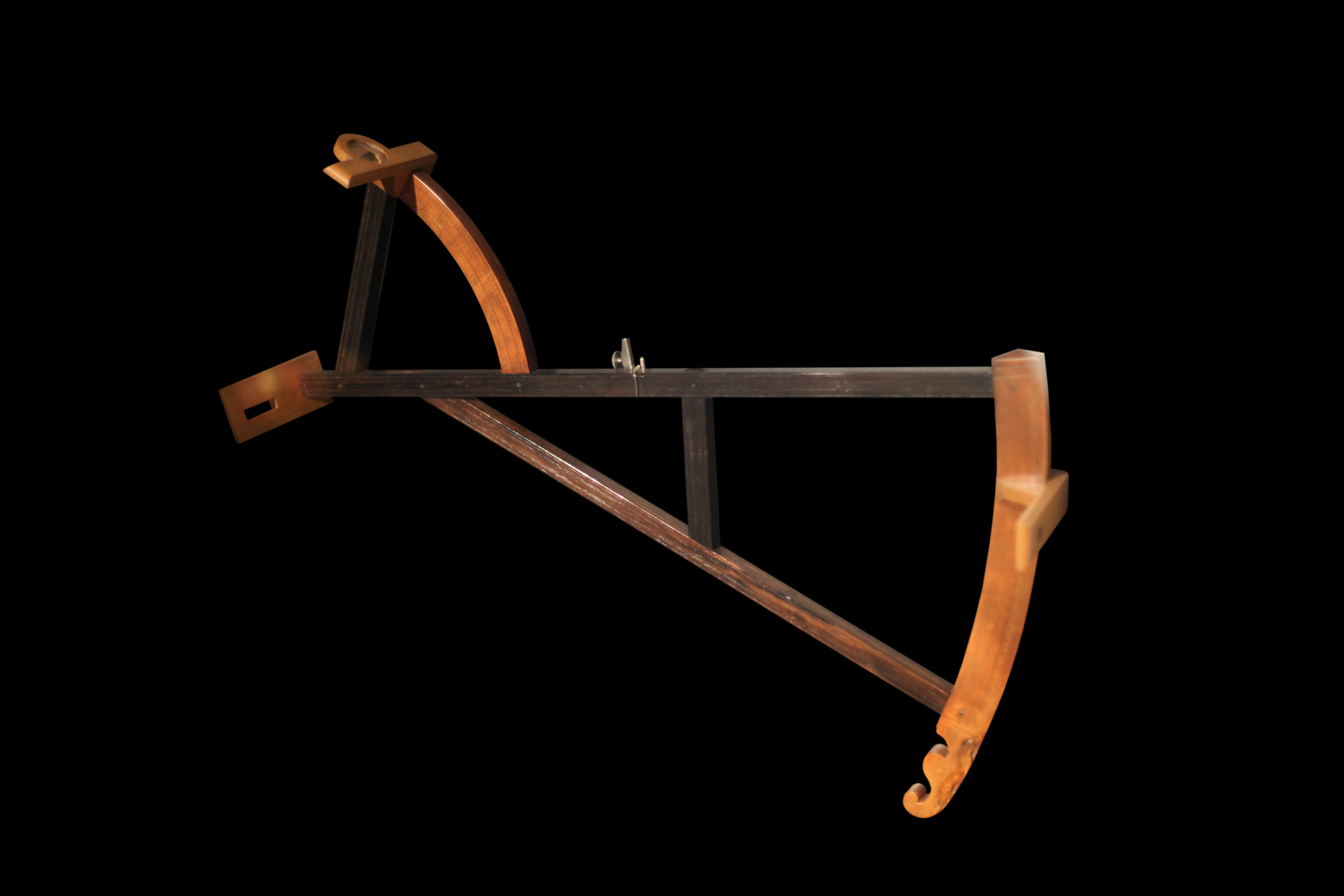
Davis quadrant, made in 1765 by Johannes Van Keulen. On display at the Musée national de la Marine in Paris.

Captain John Davis invented a version of the backstaff in 1594. Davis was a navigator who was quite familiar with the instruments of the day such as the mariner's astrolabe, the quadrant and the cross-staff. He recognized the inherent drawbacks of each and endeavoured to create a new instrument that could reduce those problems and increase the ease and accuracy of obtaining solar elevations.

One early version of the quadrant staff is shown in Figure 1. It had an arc affixed to a staff so that it could slide along the staff (the shape is not critical, though the curved shape was chosen). The arc (A) was placed so that it would cast its shadow on the horizon vane (B). The navigator would look along the staff and observe the horizon through a slit in the horizon vane. By sliding the arc so that the shadow aligned with the horizon, the angle of the sun could be read on the graduated staff. This was a simple quadrant, but it was not as accurate as one might like. The accuracy in the instrument is dependent on the length of the staff, but a long staff made the instrument more unwieldy. The maximum altitude that could be measured with this instrument was 45°.

The next version of his quadrant is shown in Figure 2. The arc on the top of the instrument in the previous version was replaced with a shadow vane placed on a transom. This transom could be moved along a graduated scale to indicate the angle of the shadow above the staff. Below the staff, a 30° arc was added. The horizon, seen through the horizon vane on the left, is aligned with the shadow. The sighting vane on the arc is moved until it aligns with the view of the horizon. The angle measured is the sum of the angle indicated by the position of the transom and the angle measured on the scale on the arc.

The instrument that is now identified with Davis is shown in Figure 3. This form evolved by the mid-17th century. The quadrant arc has been split into two parts. The smaller radius arc, with a span of 60°, was mounted above the staff. The longer radius arc, with a span of 30° was mounted below. Both arcs have a common centre. At the common centre, a slotted horizon vane was mounted (B). A moveable shadow vane was placed on the upper arc so that its shadow was cast on the horizon vane. A moveable sight vane was mounted on the lower arc (C).

It is easier for a person to place a vane at a specific location than to read the arc at an arbitrary position. This is due to Vernier acuity, the ability of a person to align two line segments accurately. Thus an arc with a small radius, marked with relatively few graduations, can be used to place the shadow vane accurately at a specific angle. On the other hand, moving the sight vane to the location where the line to the horizon meets the shadow requires a large arc. This is because the position may be at a fraction of a degree and a large arc allows one to read smaller graduations with greater accuracy. The large arc of the instrument, in later years, was marked with transversals to allow the arc to be read to greater accuracy than the main graduations allow.

Thus Davis was able to optimize the construction of the quadrant to have both a small and a large arc, allowing the effective accuracy of a single arc quadrant of large radius without making the entire instrument so large. This form of the instrument became synonymous with the backstaff. It was one of the most widely used forms of the backstaff. Continental European navigators called it the English Quadrant.

A later modification of the Davis quadrant was to use a Flamsteed glass in place of the shadow vane; this was suggested by John Flamsteed. This placed a lens on the vane that projected an image of the sun on the horizon vane instead of a shadow. It was useful under conditions where the sky was hazy or lightly overcast; the dim image of the sun was shown more brightly on the horizon vane where a shadow could not be seen.

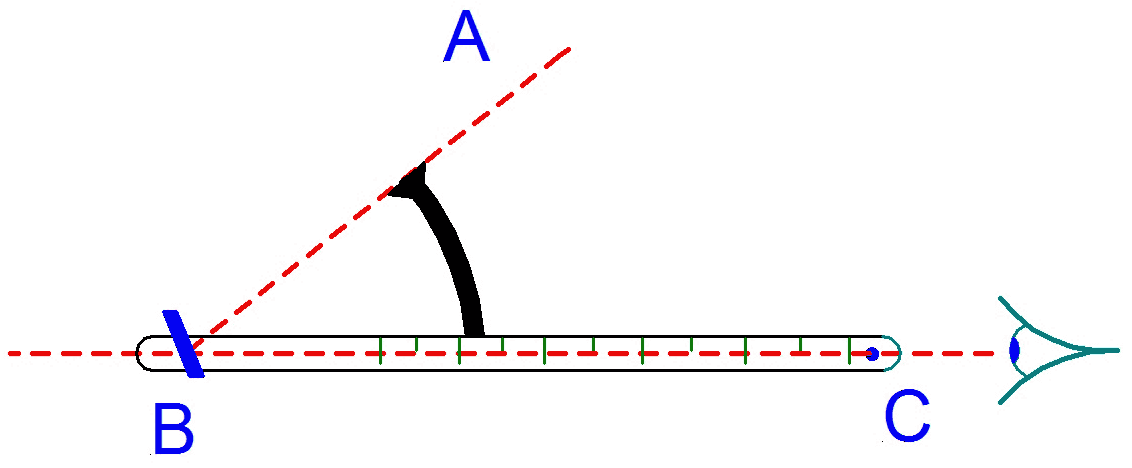
Figure 1 – A simple precursor to the Davis Quadrant after an illustration in his book, Seaman's Secrets. The arc was limited to measuring angles to 45°.

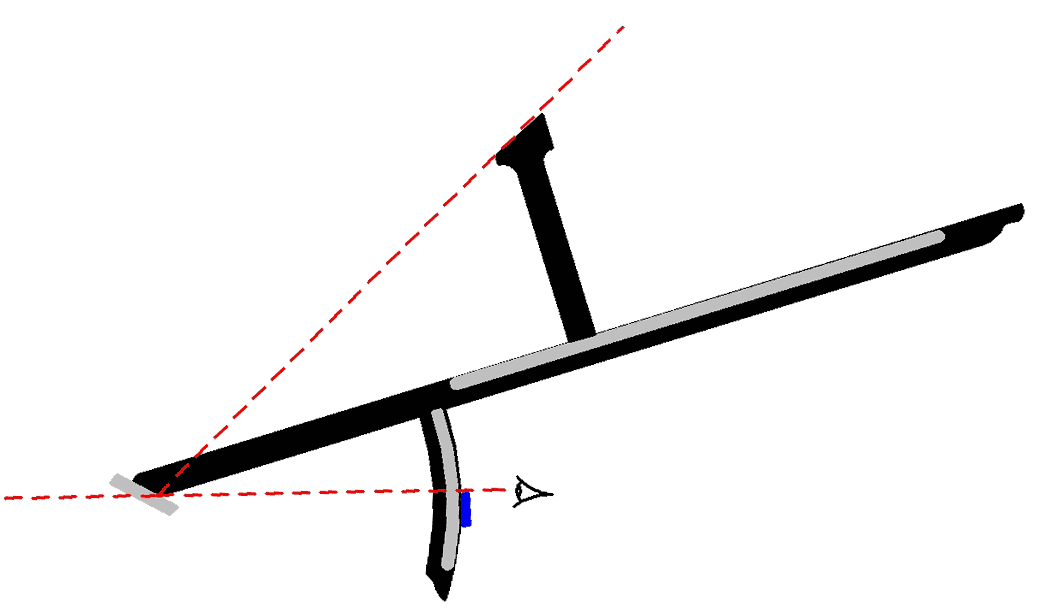
Figure 2 – The second Davis Quadrant after an illustration in his book, Seaman's Secrets. The arc above is replaced with an arc below and a shadow-casting transom above. This instrument can now measure up to 90°.

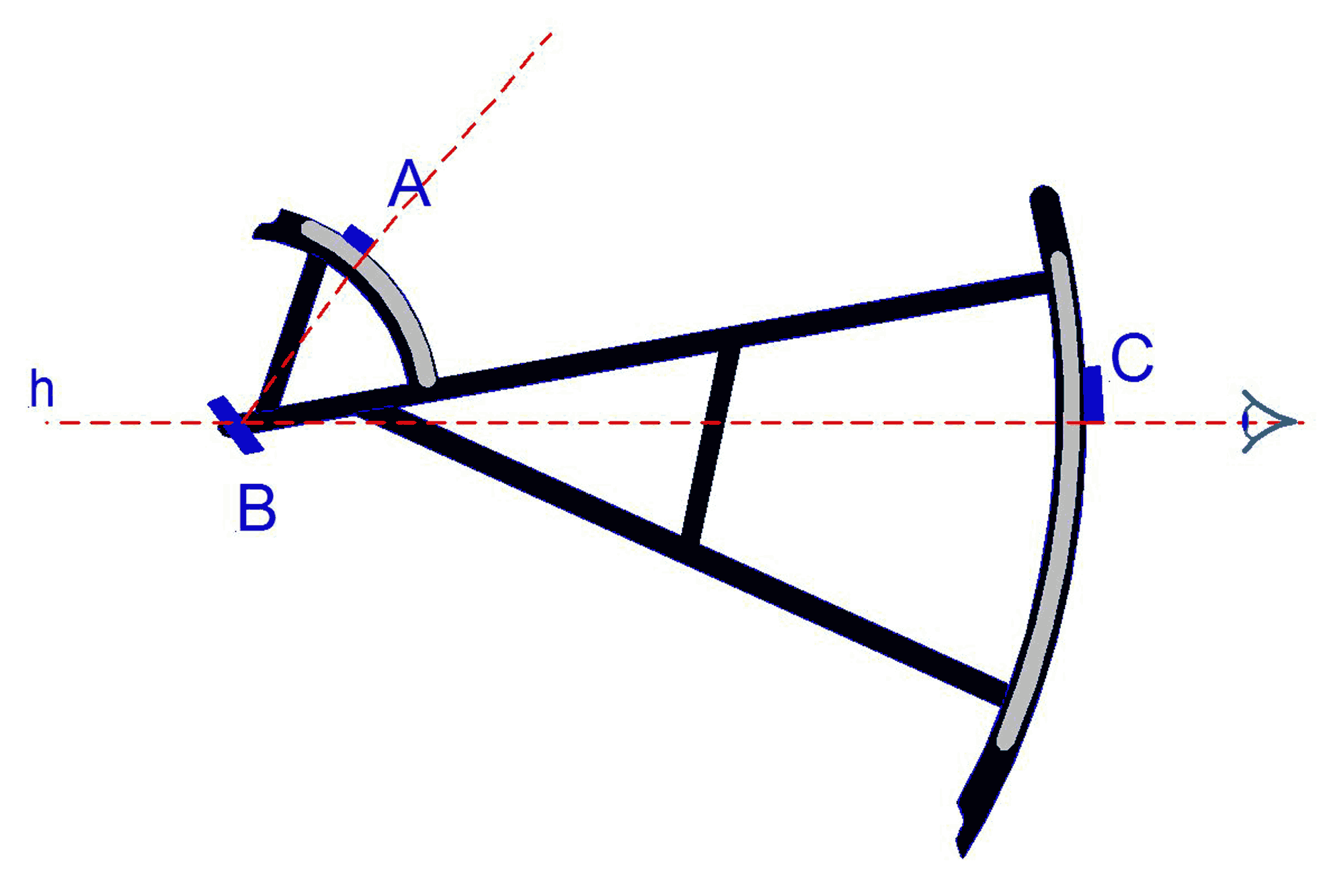
Figure 3 – The Davis Quadrant as it evolved by the mid-17th century. The upper transom has been replaced with a 60° arc.

=== Usage ===
In order to use the instrument, the navigator would place the shadow vane at a location anticipating the altitude of the sun. Holding the instrument in front of him, with the sun at his back, he holds the instrument so that the shadow cast by the shadow vane falls on the horizon vane at the side of the slit. He then moves the sight vane so that he observes the horizon in a line from the sight vane through the horizon vane's slit while simultaneously maintaining the position of the shadow. This permits him to measure the angle between the horizon and the sun as the sum of the angle read from the two arcs.

Since the shadow's edge represents the limb of the sun, he must correct the value for the semidiameter of the sun.

=== Instruments that derived from the Davis quadrant ===
The Elton's quadrant derived from the Davis quadrant. It added an index arm with spirit levels to provide an artificial horizon.

== Demi-cross ==
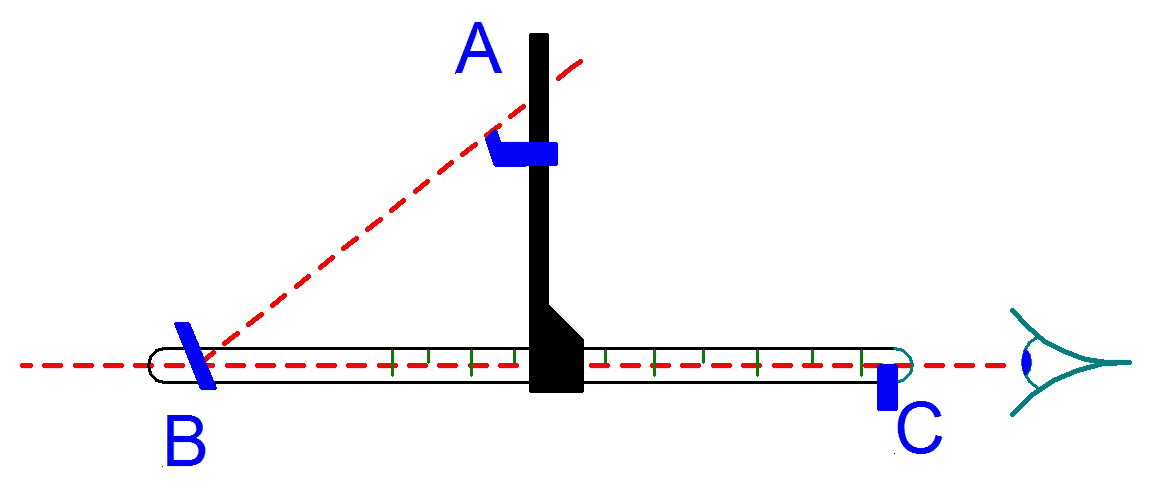
Figure 4 – A demi-cross. This instrument was contemporary with the Davis quadrant and popular outside England. It shows its similarity with the first of Davis' versions (Figure 1)

The demi-cross was an instrument that was contemporary with the Davis quadrant. It was popular outside England.

The vertical transom was like a half-transom on a cross-staff, hence the name demi-cross. It supported a shadow vane (A in Figure 4) that could be set to one of several heights (three according to May, four according to de Hilster). By setting the shadow vane height, the range of angles that could be measured was set. The transom could be slid along the staff and the angle read from one of the graduated scales on the staff.

The sight vane (C) and horizon vane (B) were aligned visually with the horizon. With the shadow vane's shadow cast on the horizon vane and aligned with the horizon, the angle was determined. In practice, the instrument was accurate but more unwieldy than the Davis quadrant.

== Plough ==
Figure 5 – The plough – a transitional instrument with the characteristics of both a cross-staff and a backstaff

The plough was the name given to an unusual instrument that existed for a short time. It was part cross-staff and part backstaff. In Figure 5, A is the transom that casts its shadow on the horizon vane at B. It functions in the same manner as the staff in Figure 1. C is the sighting vane. The navigator uses the sighting vane and the horizon vane to align the instrument horizontally. The sighting vane can be moved left to right along the staff. D is a transom just as one finds on a cross-staff. This transom has two vanes on it that can be moved closer or farther from the staff to emulate different-length transoms. The transom can be moved on the staff and used to measure angles.

== Almucantar staff ==
The Almucantar staff is a device specifically used for measuring the altitude of the sun at low altitudes.

== Cross-staff ==
The cross-staff was normally a direct observation instrument. However, in later years it was modified for use with back observations.

== Quadrant ==
There was a variation of the quadrant – the Back observation quadrant – that was used for measuring the sun's altitude by observing the shadow cast on a horizon vane.

== Thomas Hood cross-staff ==
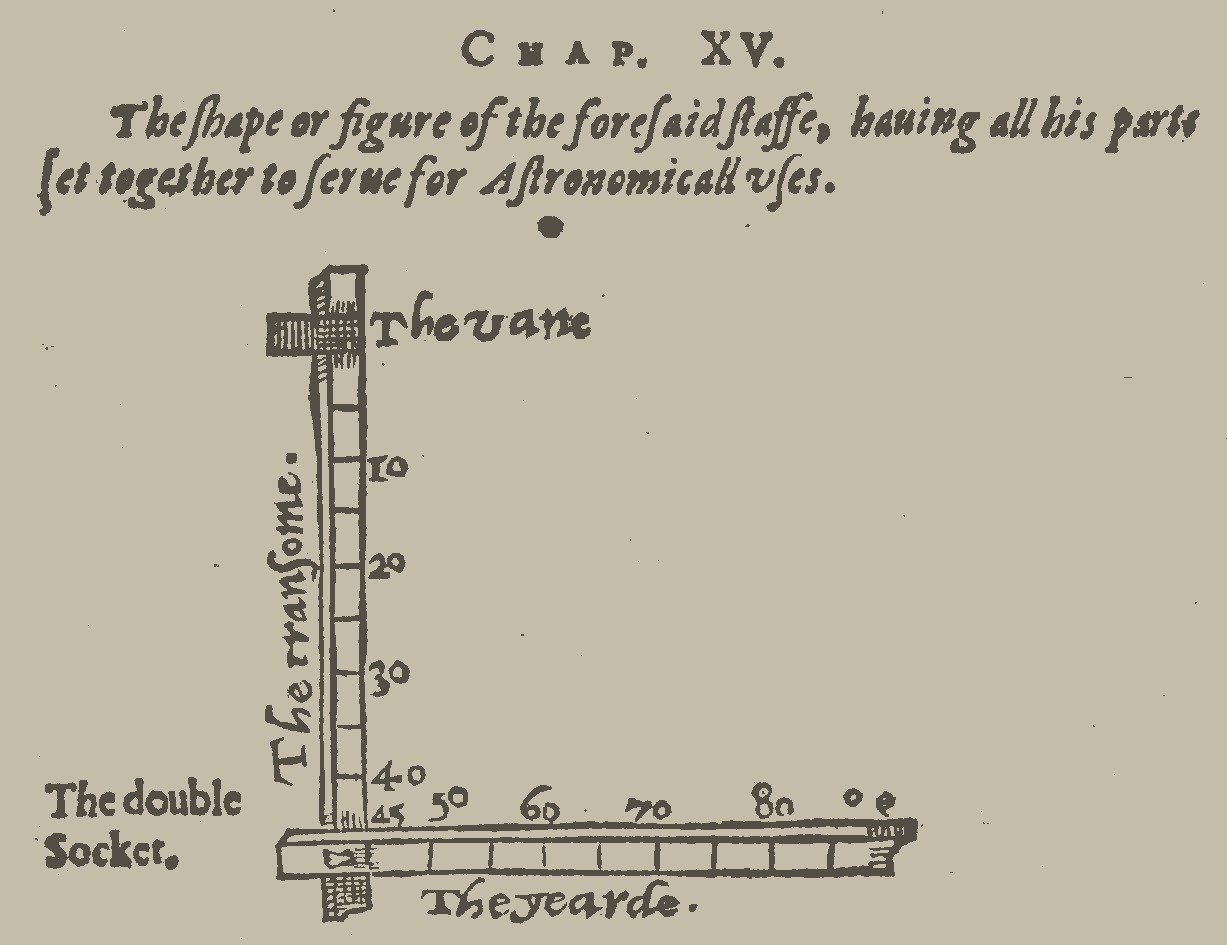
Figure 6 – Cross-staff by Thomas Hood. Though called a cross-staff, this instrument uses a shadow vane to cast a shadow on the instrument to measure the altitude of the sun.

Thomas Hood invented this cross-staff in 1590. It could be used for surveying, astronomy or other geometric problems.

It consists of two components, a transom and a yard. The transom is the vertical component and is graduated from 0° at the top to 45° at the bottom. At the top of the transom, a vane is mounted to cast a shadow. The yard is horizontal and is graduated from 45° to 90°. The transom and yard are joined by a special fitting (the double socket in Figure 6) that permits independent adjustments of the transom vertically and the yard horizontally.

It was possible to construct the instrument with the yard at the top of the transom rather than at the bottom.

Initially, the transom and yard are set so that the two are joined at their respective 45° settings. The instrument is held so that the yard is horizontal (the navigator can view the horizon along the yard to assist in this). The socket is loosened so that the transom is moved vertically until the shadow of the vane is cast at the yard's 90° setting. If the movement of just the transom can accomplish this, the altitude is given by the transom's graduations. If the sun is too high for this, the yard horizontal opening in the socket is loosened and the yard is moved to allow the shadow to land on the 90° mark. The yard then yields the altitude.

It was a fairly accurate instrument, as the graduations were well spaced compared to a conventional cross-staff. However, it was a bit unwieldy and difficult to handle in wind.

== Benjamin Cole quadrant ==
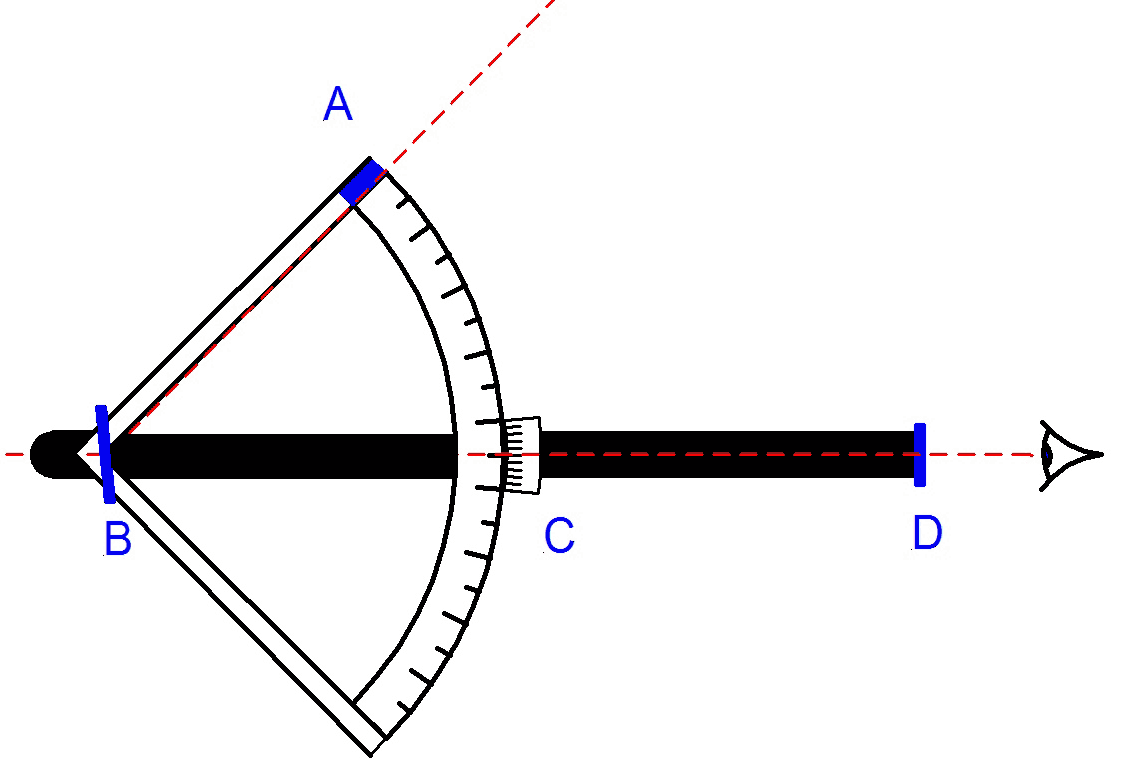
Figure 7 – Cole quadrant from 1748.

A late addition to the collection of backstaves in the navigation world, this device was invented by Benjamin Cole in 1748.

The instrument consists of a staff with a pivoting quadrant on one end. The quadrant has a shadow vane, which can optionally take a lens like the Davis quadrant's Flamsteed glass, at the upper end of the graduated scale (A in Figure 7). This casts a shadow or projects an image of the sun on the horizon vane (B). The observer views the horizon through a hole in the sight vane (D) and a slit in the horizon vane to ensure the instrument is level. The quadrant component is rotated until the horizon and the sun's image or shadow are aligned. The altitude can then be read from the quadrant's scale. In order to refine the reading, a circular vernier is mounted on the staff (C).

The fact that such an instrument was introduced in the middle of the 18th century shows that the quadrant was still a viable instrument even in the presence of the octant.

English scientist George Adams created a very similar backstaff at the same time. Adam's version ensured that the distance between the Flamsteed glass and horizon vane was the same as the distance from the vane to the sight vane.

== Cross bow quadrant ==
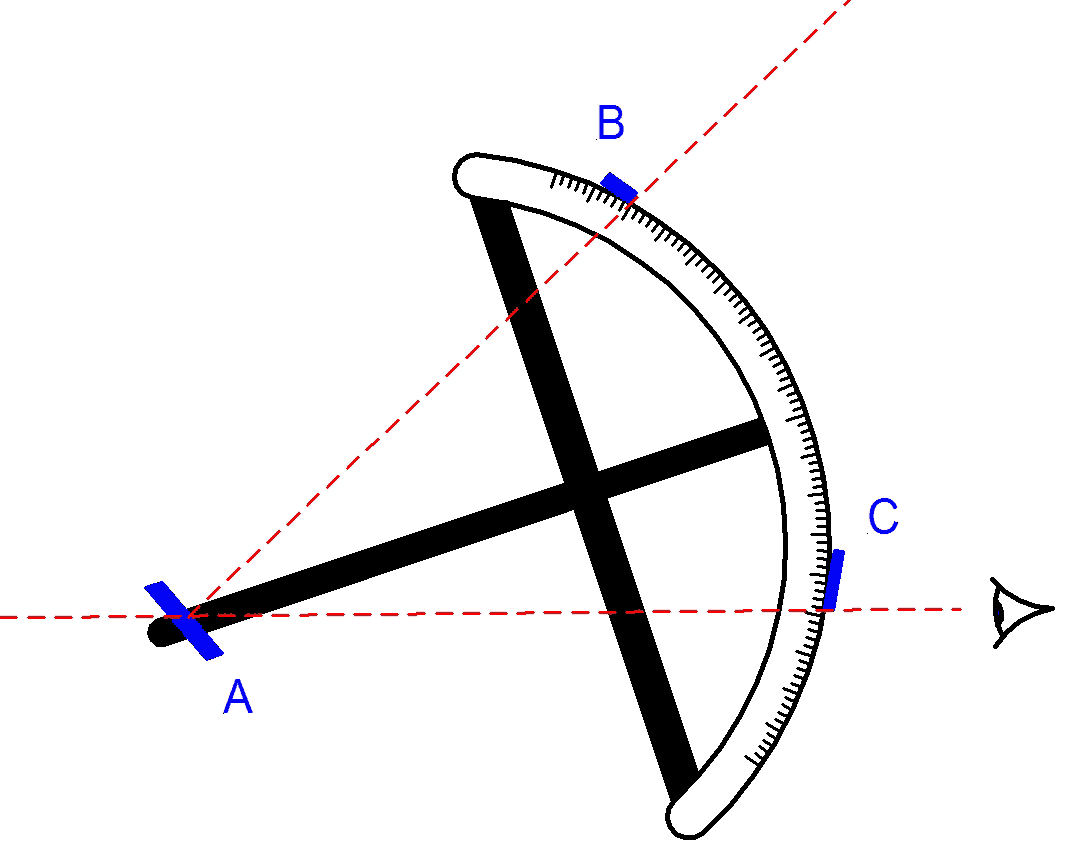
Figure 8 – Drawing of a cross bow quadrant. The 120° arc was graduated as a 90° arc, resulting in divisions that are slightly greater than their nominal arc size.

Edmund Gunter invented the cross bow quadrant, also called the mariner's bow, around 1623. It gets its name from the similarity to the archer's crossbow.

This instrument is interesting in that the arc is 120° but is only graduated as a 90° arc. As such, the angular spacing of a degree on the arc is slightly greater than one degree. Examples of the instrument can be found with a 0° to 90° graduation or with two mirrored 0° to 45° segments centred on the midpoint of the arc.

The instrument has three vanes, a horizon vane (A in Figure 8) which has an opening in it to observe the horizon, a shadow vane (B) to cast a shadow on the horizon vane and a sighting vane (C) that the navigator uses to view the horizon and shadow at the horizon vane. This serves to ensure the instrument is level while simultaneously measuring the altitude of the sun. The altitude is the difference in the angular positions of the shadow and sighting vanes.

With some versions of this instrument, the sun's declination for each day of the year was marked on the arc. This permitted the navigator to set the shadow vane to the date and the instrument would read the altitude directly.
