= Cruising (maritime) =

Traveling by boat for pleasure

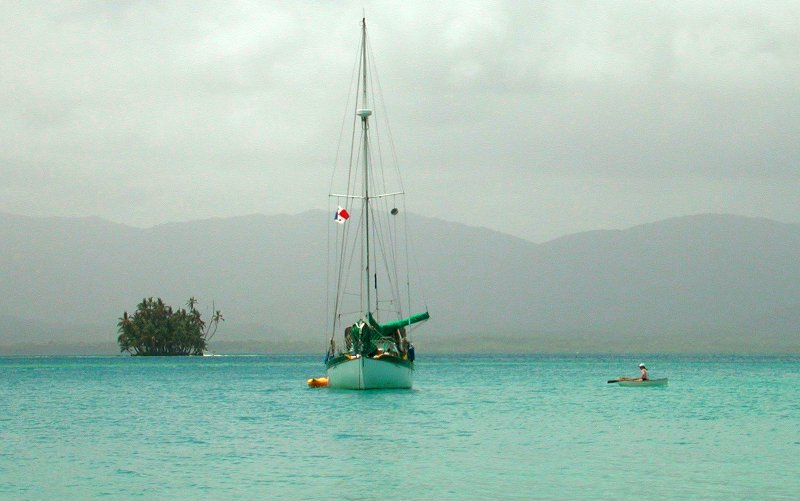
A cruising sailboat anchored in the San Blas Islands, in Panama

Cruising is a maritime activity that involves staying aboard a watercraft for extended periods of time when the vessel is traveling on water at a steady speed. Cruising generally refers to leisurely trips on yachts and luxury cruiseships, with durations varying from day-trips to months-long round-the-world voyages.

== History ==
"The sea, the great unifier, is man's only hope. Now, as never before,
the old phrase has a literal meaning: We are all in the same boat."

— Jacques Cousteau

Boats were almost exclusively used for working purposes prior to the nineteenth century. In 1857, the philosopher Henry David Thoreau, with his book Canoeing in Wilderness chronicling his canoe voyaging in the wilderness of Maine, is considered the first to convey the enjoyment of spiritual and lifestyle aspects of cruising.

"Canal barges in Belgium", an image from Robert Louis Stevenson's book, An Inland Voyage

The modern conception of cruising for pleasure was first popularised by the Scottish explorer and sportsman John MacGregor. He was introduced to the canoes and kayaks of the Native Americans on a camping trip in 1858, and on his return to the United Kingdom constructed his own 'double-ended' canoe in Lambeth. The boat, nicknamed 'Rob Roy' after a famous relative of his, was built of lapstrake oak planking, decked in cedar covered with rubberized canvas with an open cockpit in the center. He cruised around the waterways of Britain, Europe and the Middle East and wrote a popular book about his experiences, A Thousand Miles in the Rob Roy Canoe.

In 1866, Macgregor was a moving force behind the establishment of the Royal Canoe Club, the first club in the world to promote pleasure cruising. The first recorded regatta was held on April 27, 1867, and it received Royal patronage in 1873. The latter part of the century saw cruising for leisure being enthusiastically taken up by the middle class. The author Robert Louis Stevenson wrote An Inland Voyage in 1877 as a travelogue on his canoeing trip through France and Belgium. Stevenson and his companion, Sir Walter Grindlay Simpson travelled in two 'Rob Roys' along the Oise River and witnessed the Romantic beauty of rural Europe.

The Canadian-American Joshua Slocum was one of the first people to carry out a long-distance sailing voyage for pleasure, circumnavigating the world between 1895 and 1898. Despite opinion that such a voyage was impossible, Slocum rebuilt a derelict 37-foot (11 m) sloop Spray and sailed her single-handed around the world. His book Sailing Alone Around the World was a classic adventure, and inspired many others to take to the seas.

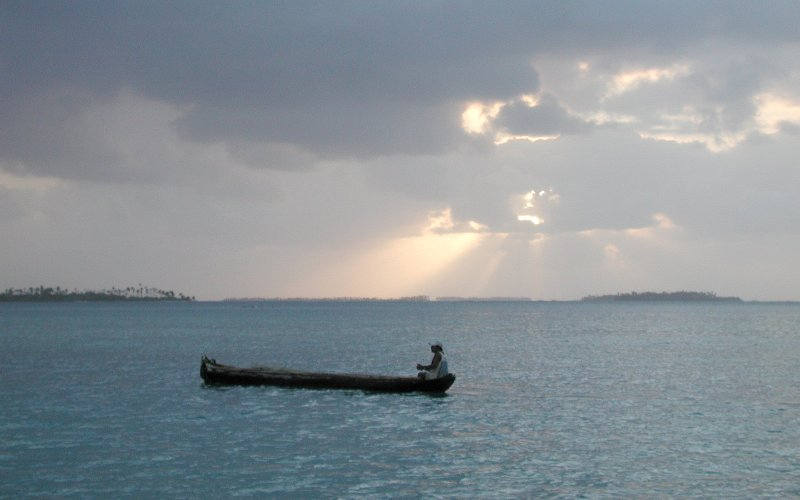
Cruisers can see traditional life in remote areas of the world; here, a Guna canoeist paddles a dugout canoe in the San Blas Islands.

Other cruising authors have provided both inspiration and instruction to prospective cruisers. Key among these during the post World War II period are Electa and Irving Johnson, Miles and Beryl Smeeton, Bernard Moitessier, Peter Pye, and Eric and Susan Hiscock. During the 1970s - 1990s Robin Lee Graham, Lin and Larry Pardey, Annie Hill, Herb Payson, Linda and Steve Dashew, Margaret and Hal Roth, and Beth Leonard & Evans Starzinger have provided inspiration for people to set off voyaging.

The development of ocean crossing rallies, most notably the ARC (Atlantic Rally for Cruisers), have encouraged less experienced sailors to undertake ocean crossings. These rallies provide a group of sailors crossing the same ocean at the same time with safety inspections, weather information and social functions.

== Types of boats used ==
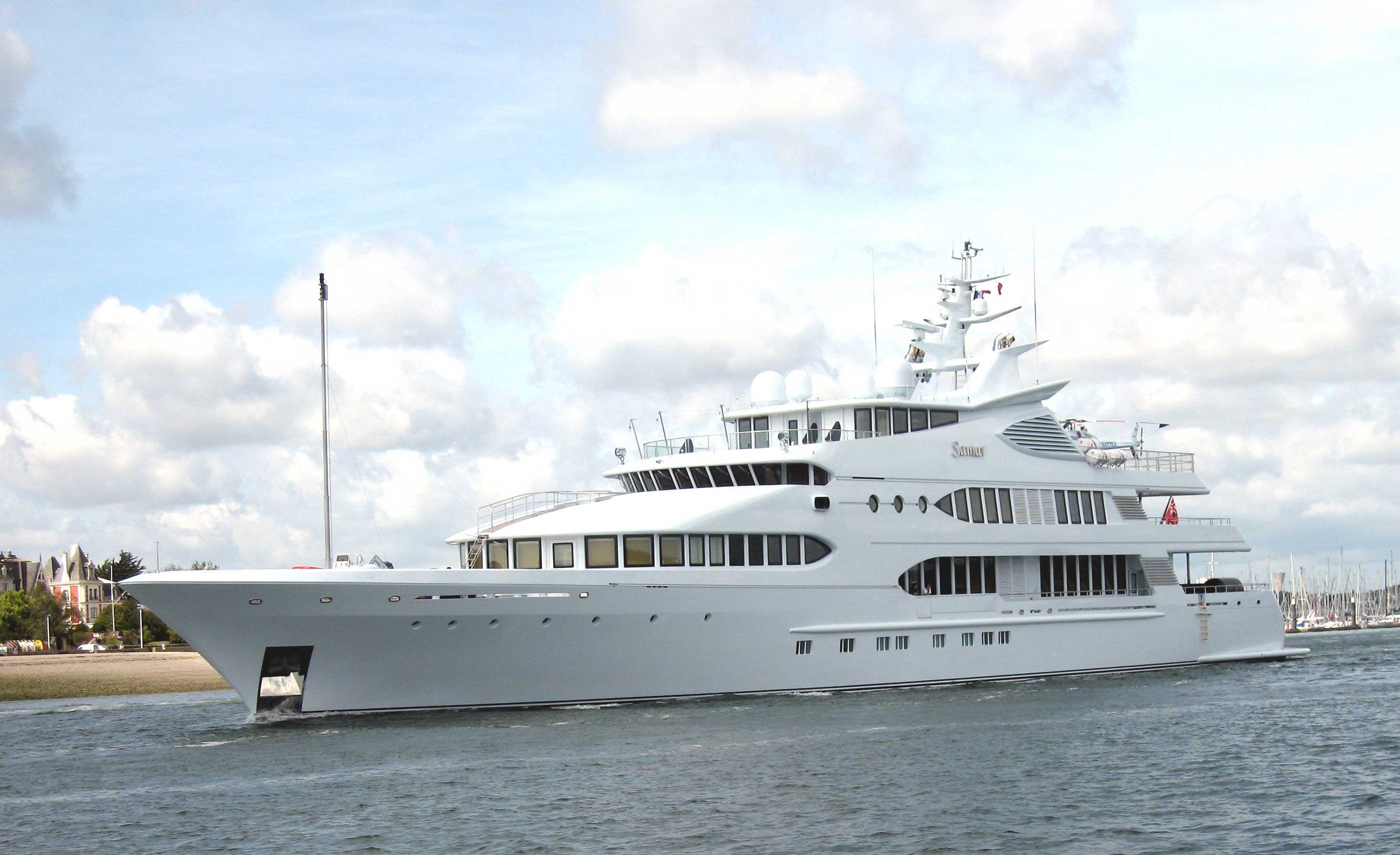
A motor yacht in Lorient, Bretagne, France

Cruising is done on both sail and power boats, monohulls and multihulls although sail predominates over longer distances, as ocean-going power boats are considerably more expensive to purchase and operate. The size of the typical cruising boat has increased over the years and is currently in the range of 10 to 15 metres (33 to 50 feet) although smaller boats have been used in around-the-world trips, but are generally not recommended given the dangers involved. Many cruisers are "long term" and travel for many years, the most adventurous among them circle the globe over a period of three to ten years. Many others take a year or two off from work and school for shorter trips and the chance to experience the cruising lifestyle.

== Types ==
=== Blue-water and coastal cruising ===
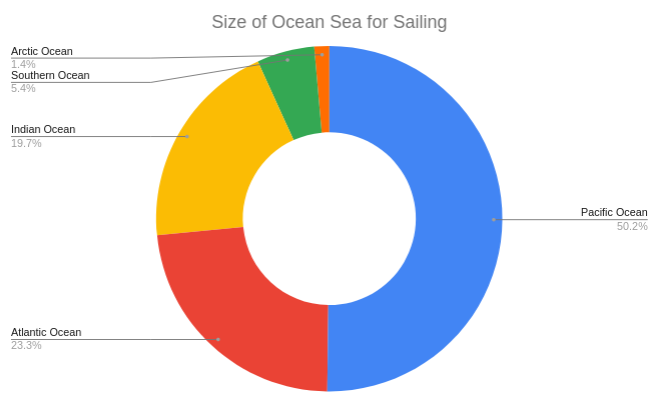
Size of Ocean Sea for Sailing

Blue-water cruising which is defined as long term open sea cruising is more involved and inherently more dangerous than coastal cruising. Before embarking on an open-ocean voyage, planning and preparation will include studying charts, weather reports/warnings, almanacs and navigation books of the route to be followed. In addition, supplies need to be stocked (including fresh water and fuel), navigation instruments checked and the ship itself needs to be inspected and the crew needs to be given exact instruction on the jobs are expected to perform (e.g. the watch, which is generally 4 hours on and 4 hours off, navigation, steering, rigging sails, ...). In addition, the crew needs to be well trained at working together and with the ship in question. Finally, the sailor must be mentally prepared for dealing with harsh situations. There have been many well-documented cases where sailors had to be rescued simply because they were not sufficiently prepared (the sailors as well as the ship) or lacked experience for their venture and ran into serious trouble.

Sailing near the coast (coastal cruising) gives a certain amount of safety. A ship is always granted 'innocent passage' through the country (most countries usually claim up to 22 km (14 mi) off the coast). When this method is practiced however, if the ship needs to stop (e.g. for repairs), a trip to a customs checkpoint to have passports checked would be required.

=== River cruising ===
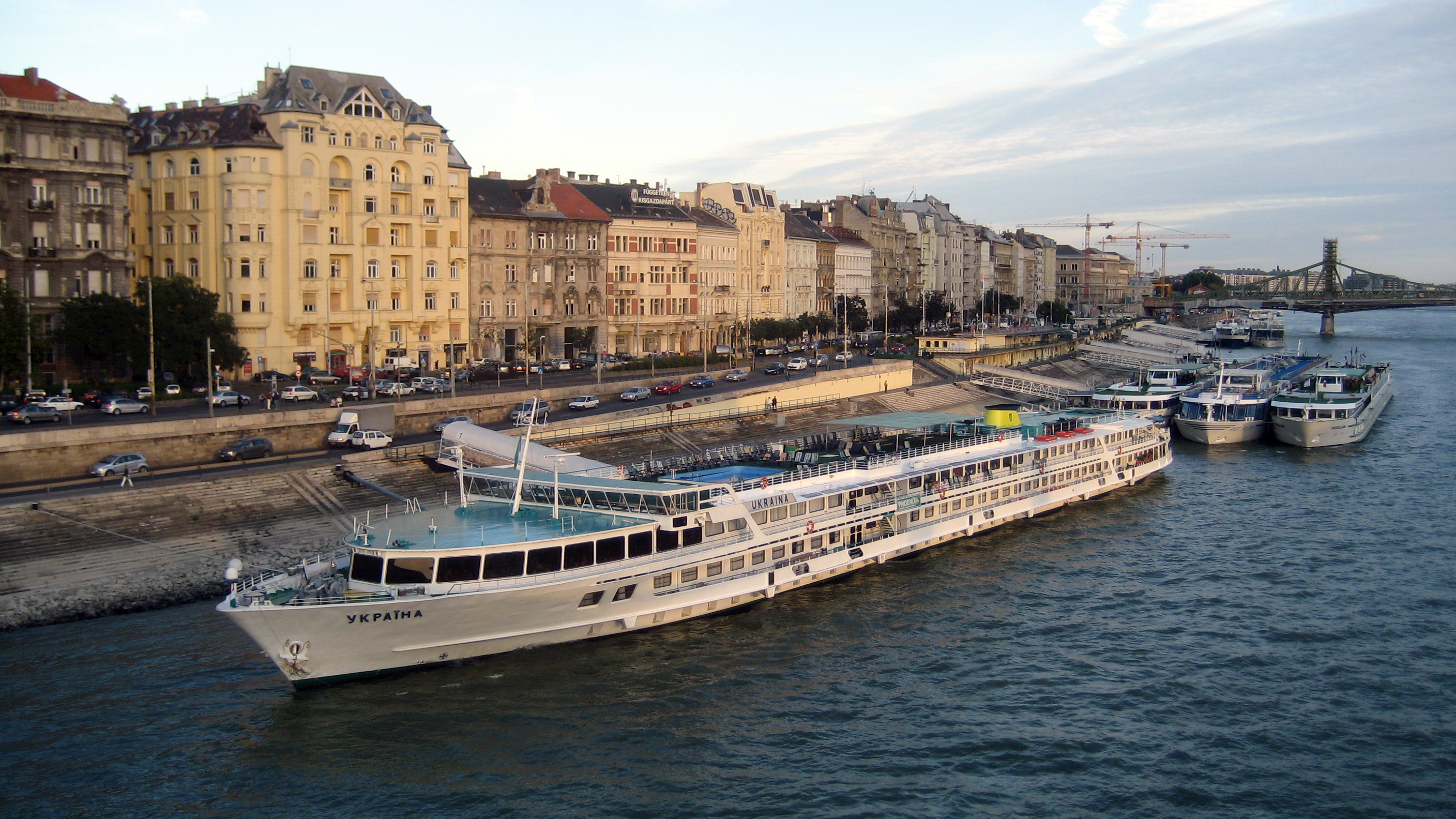
River cruise ships docked along on the Danube in Budapest

Voyages along inland waterways are called river cruises, which often involved stopping at multiple ports along the way. As many cities and towns are built around rivers and historically have relied on maritime transport, river cruise docks are frequently located in the center of cities and towns.

According to Douglas Ward, "A river cruise represents life in the slow lane, sailing along at a gentle pace, soaking up the scenery, with plentiful opportunities to explore riverside towns and cities en route. It is a supremely calming experience, an antidote to the pressures of life in a fast-paced world, in surroundings that are comfortable without being fussy or pretentious, with good food and enjoyable company."

River cruising is a major component of the tourist industry in many parts of the world.

== Equipment ==
Cruisers use a variety of equipment and techniques to make their voyages possible, or simply more comfortable. The use of wind vane self-steering was common on long-distance cruising yachts but is increasingly being supplemented or replaced by electrical auto-pilots.

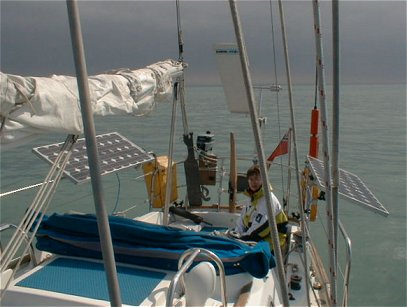
The solar panels on this 28-foot (8.5 m) yacht can keep her self-sufficient in electrical power.

Though in the past many cruisers had no means of generating electricity on board and depended on kerosene and dry-cell batteries, today electrical demands are much higher and nearly all cruisers have electrical devices such as lights, communications equipment and refrigeration. Although most boats can generate power from their inboard engines, an increasing number carry auxiliary generators. Carrying sufficient fuel to power engine and generator over a long voyage can be a problem, so many cruising boats are equipped with other ancillary generating devices such as solar panels, wind turbines and towed turbines. Cruisers choosing to spend extended time in very remote locations with minimal access to marinas can opt to equip their vessels with watermakers (reverse-osmosis seawater desalination units) used to convert sea water to potable fresh water.

Satellite communications are becoming more common on cruising boats. Many boats are now equipped with satellite telephone systems; however, these systems can be expensive to use, and may operate only in certain areas. Many cruisers still use short wave maritime SSB and amateur radio, which has no running costs. These radios provide two-way voice communications, can receive weather fax graphics or GRIB files via a laptop computer, and with a compatible modem (e.g. PACTOR) can send and receive email at very slow speed. Such emails are usually limited to basic communication using plain text, without HTML formatting or attachments.

Awareness of impending weather conditions is particularly important to cruising sailors who are often far from safe harbours and need to steer clear of dangerous weather conditions. Most cruising boats are equipped with a barometer or a weather station that records barometric pressure as well as temperature and provides rudimentary forecasting. For more sophisticated weather forecasting, cruisers rely on their ability to receive forecasts by radio, phone or satellite.

In order to avoid collisions with other vessels, cruisers rely on a maintaining a regular watch schedule. At night, color-coded running lights help determine the position and orientation of vessels. Radar and AIS systems are often employed to detect vessels positions and movement in all conditions (day, night, rain and fog).

Cruisers navigate using paper charts and radar. Modern yachts are often also equipped with a chartplotter which enables the use of electronic charts and is linked to GPS satellites that provide position reports. Some chartplotters have the ability to interface charts and radar images. Those that still wish to work with traditional charts as well as with GPS may do so using a Yeoman Plotter. Certain advanced sailing vessels have a completely automated sailing system which includes a plotter, as well as course correcting through a link with the ship's steering organs (e.g. sails, propeller). One such device can be found at the Maltese Falcon.

There are also sails made with cruising in mind. Sailing downwind is always enjoyable, but there is a vast difference as to how easy it is to manage - especially short-handed. This is where furling sails come into play, and these vary from the more specialized types of furling spinnakers to combined products such as the blue water runner-type of sails.

== Expense ==
Purchasing and maintaining a yacht can be costly. Most cruising sailors do not own a house and consider their boat their home during the duration of their cruise. Many cruisers find they spend, on average, 4% of their boat's purchase price annually on boat maintenance.

Like living a conventional life on land, the cost of cruising is variable. How much a person ends up spending depends largely on their spending habits (for example, eating out a lot and frequenting marinas vs. preparing local foods aboard and anchoring out) and the type of boat (fancy modern production boats are very expensive to purchase and maintain, while low-key cruising boats often involve much lower expenses). Most long-term cruisers prefer to live a simple life, usually with far lower expenses than people who live ashore.

An alternative solution is to sail on someone else's yacht. Those who know how to sail can sometimes find boats looking for an extra crewmember for a long trip, while some non-sailors are also able to find boats willing to carry a hitch-hiker. Crew-finding websites exist to help match-up people looking for a crossing with yachts with a berth available or looking for a temporary crewmember, Find a Crew for example. Another common tactic for finding a yacht is to visit local yacht clubs and marinas and get to know the sailors there, in the hope that one of them will be able to provide a berth.

== Safety ==
Travel by water brings hazards: collision, weather, and equipment failure can lead to dangerous situations such as a sinking or severely disabled and dangerous vessel. For this reason many long-distance cruising yachts carry with them emergency equipment such as SARTs, EPIRBs and liferafts or proactive lifeboats. Medical emergencies are also of concern, as a medical emergency can occur on a long passage when the closest port is over a week away. For this reason before going cruising many people go through first aid training and carry medical kits. In some parts of the world (e.g., near the Horn of Africa) piracy can be a problem.

== Other kinds of maritime cruising ==
- A booze cruise is a pleasure outing on a ship or boat involving a significant amount of drinking. It may have originated during Prohibition, when Americans would take "cruises to nowhere" to enjoy alcohol, which could legally be served on board once outside American territorial waters.
- Camp cruising, also known as beach cruising or gunkhole cruising, is a form of cruising in which sailors sail from point to point in an open or semi-enclosed boat, generally remaining within sight of land. Camp cruisers either camp ashore ("camp cruising" or "beach cruising"), or aboard the boat at anchor. The boats used may be specialized cruising dinghies, small keelboats, trailer sailers or general purpose daysailing or racing boats pressed into service for the purpose.
- Commute cruising, also known as seasonal cruising, is becoming increasingly popular. Commute cruisers live aboard and sail for a few months at a time, exploring new or favorite areas, then leave the vessel in a new location or maybe return it to the same location, travel home for a few months, and return to the vessel to continue cruising during favorable seasons. This type of cruising is somewhat akin to owning a second home that travels by sea and allows for a dual lifestyle.
- Daysailing is recreational sailing that does not involve racing or cruising. Many racers refer to all non-racers as "cruisers", including dinghy and small keelboat sailors who primarily focus on daysailing.
- LGBT sailing cruising is a type of specialized recreational boat cruising tour organized by cruising operators in many regions of the world. Trips are organized for the LGBT community to provide a unique experience within a "safe space" where travelers can explore new places.
- Expedition cruising, where the trips can be a combination of scientists working and tourists along for the adventure, or where scientists lead a group of tourists in order for the tourists to observe animals, plants or natural phenomena.
- Travel on cruise ships may be referred to as cruising. Those who take frequent cruise ship vacations may be called cruisers.

== See also ==
- Boat building
- Cabin cruiser
- Electric boat
- Gunkholing
- Maritime mobile amateur radio
- River cruise
- Sailboat
- The Cruising Association
