= Fubai-class tanker =

Naval auxiliary vessel

History

PRC
- Status: Active

General characteristics
- Class & type: Fubai class
- Sensors & processing systems: Navigation radar
- Electronic warfare & decoys: None
- Armament: Unarmed
- Aircraft carried: None
- Aviation facilities: None

Fubai class tanker is a class of naval auxiliary ship currently in service with the People's Liberation Army Navy (PLAN), and has received NATO reporting name Fubai class. The exact type designation remains unknown, and a total of four of this class have been confirmed in active service as of early-2020s.

Fubai class ships in PLAN service are designated by a combination of two Chinese characters followed by a three-digit number. The second Chinese character is You (油), meaning oil in Chinese, because these ships are classified as oil tankers. The first Chinese character denotes which fleet the ship is service with, with East (Dong, 东) for East Sea Fleet, North (Bei, 北) for North Sea Fleet, and South (Nan, 南) for South Sea Fleet. However, the pennant numbers are subject to change due to the change of Chinese naval ships naming convention, or when units are transferred to different fleets. Specification:

- Length: 100 meter

Type	NATO designation	Pennant No.	Name (English)	Name (Han 中文)	Commissioned	Displacement	Fleet	Status
Fubai class transport oil tanker (AOT)	Fubai class	Dong-You 640	East Oil 640	东油 640	?	? t	East Sea Fleet	Active
Fubai class transport oil tanker (AOT)	Fubai class	Nan-You 968	South Oil 968	南油 968	?	? t	South Sea Fleet	Active
Fubai class transport oil tanker (AOT)	Fubai class	Nan-You 971	South Oil 971	南油 971	?	? t	South Sea Fleet	Active
Fubai class transport oil tanker (AOT)	Fubai class	Nan-You 972	South Oil 972	南油 972	?	? t	South Sea Fleet	Active

External image
- Fubai class tanker Dongyou-640(on the right) and Fujian-class tanker Dongshui-650(on the left) in a joint exercise
- http://eng.mod.gov.cn/xb/News_213114/Photos/16369728_3.html
