= Dujiang-class tug =

Chinese harbor tug class

History

PRC
- Status: Active

General characteristics
- Class & type: Dujiang
- Type: Medium harbor tug (YTM)
- Propulsion: Marine Diesel
- Sensors & processing systems: Navigation radar
- Electronic warfare & decoys: None
- Armament: Unarmed
- Armour: None
- Aircraft carried: None
- Aviation facilities: None

Dujiang class tug is a class of little known medium harbor tug (YTM) built in the People’s Republic of China (PRC) for the People's Liberation Army Navy (PLAN). The exact domestic Chinese type designation remain unknown, and this class is identified by its NATO reporting name Dujiang class, or 渡江 in Chinese, meaning Crossing the River. Dujiang class is a design with a single deck and two levels of superstructures, with a semi-enclosed platform atop the second level.

== Nomenclature ==
Dujiang class in PLAN service is designated by a combination of two Chinese characters followed by three-digit number. The second Chinese character is Tuo (拖), meaning Tug in Chinese. The first Chinese character denotes which fleet the ship is service with, with East (Dong, 东) for East Sea Fleet, North (Bei, 北) for North Sea Fleet, and South (Nan, 南) for South Sea Fleet. However, the pennant numbers may have changed due to the change of Chinese naval ships naming convention, or when units have been transferred to different fleets. As of mid 2010s, more than four ships have been identified:

Type	NATO designation	Pennant No.	Name (English)	Name (Han 中文)	Commissioned	Displacement	Fleet	Status
Dujiang class medium harbor tug (YTM)	Dujiang class	Bei-Tuo 644	North Tug 644	北拖 644	?	? t	North Sea Fleet	Active
Dujiang class medium harbor tug (YTM)	Dujiang class	Bei-Tuo 648	North Tug 648	北拖 648	?	? t	North Sea Fleet	Active
Dujiang class medium harbor tug (YTM)	Dujiang class	Bei-Tuo 659	North Tug 659	北拖 659	?	? t	North Sea Fleet	Active
Dujiang class medium harbor tug (YTM)	Dujiang class	Dong-Tuo 841	East Tug 841	东拖 841	?	? t	East Sea Fleet	Active
Dujiang class medium harbor tug (YTM)	Dujiang class	Dong-Tuo 848	East Tug 848	东拖 848	?	? t	East Sea Fleet	Active
Dujiang class medium harbor tug (YTM)	Dujiang class	Various	Various	Various	?	? t	?	Under construction
