= Yanjiu-class survey ship =

Chinese survey vessel

History

PRC
- Status: Active

General characteristics
- Class & type: Yanjiu
- Type: Survey vessel (AGS)
- Propulsion: Marine Diesel
- Sensors & processing systems: Navigation radar

The Yanjiu class is a class of little known survey vessel (AGS) built in the People's Republic of China (PRC) for the People's Liberation Army Navy (PLAN). The exact domestic Chinese type designation remain unknown, and this class is identified by its NATO reporting name Yanjiu class, or 研究 in Chinese, meaning research. The Yanjiu class in PLAN service is designated by a combination of two Chinese characters followed by a three-digit number. The second Chinese character is Ce (测), meaning Survey in Chinese. The first Chinese character denotes which fleet the ship is service with, with East (Dong, 东) for East Sea Fleet, North (Bei, 北) for North Sea Fleet, and South (Nan, 南) for South Sea Fleet. However, the pennant numbers are subject to change due to the change of Chinese naval ships naming convention, or when units are transferred to different fleets. As of mid 2010s, a total of two ships have been identified:

Type	NATO designation	Pennant No.	Name (English)	Name (Han 中文)	Commissioned	Displacement	Fleet	Status
Yanjiu-class survey ship (AGS)	Yanjiu class	Dong-Ce 228	East Survey 228	东测 228	?	? t	East Sea Fleet	Active
Yanjiu-class survey ship (AGS)	Yanjiu class	Dong-Ce 229	East Survey 229	东测 229	?	? t	East Sea Fleet	Active
