= Duda-class tug =

Chinese naval auxiliary ship class

History

PRC
- Status: Active

General characteristics
- Class & type: Duda class
- Type: Tug
- Length: 31 m (101 ft 8 in)
- Sensors & processing systems: Navigation radar
- Electronic warfare & decoys: None
- Armament: Unarmed
- Aircraft carried: None
- Aviation facilities: None

Duda class large harbor tug (YTB) is a class of little known naval auxiliary ship currently in service with the People's Liberation Army Navy (PLAN), and has received NATO reporting name Duda class, with exact type still remains unknown. A total of eleven of this class have been confirmed in active service as of 2022 Unlike other tugs in Chinese service, This class is the only tug having a chimney with rectangular/square cross section, and thus easily distinguishable by the sharp edges of the chimney.

Ships of this class in PLAN service are designated by a combination of two Chinese characters followed by a three-digit number. The second Chinese character is Tuo (拖), meaning tug in Chinese, because these ships are classified as tugboats. The first Chinese character denotes which fleet the ship is service with, with East (Dong, 东) for East Sea Fleet, North (Bei, 北) for North Sea Fleet, and South (Nan, 南) for South Sea Fleet. However, the pennant numbers are subject to change due to changes of Chinese naval ships naming convention, or when units are transferred to different fleets. Specification:

- Length: 31 meter

Type	NATO designation	Pennant No.	Name (English)	Name (Han 中文)	Commissioned	Displacement	Fleet	Status
Duda class large harbor tug (YTB)	Duda class	Bei-Tuo 632	North Tug 632	北拖 632	?	? t	North Sea Fleet	Active
Duda class large harbor tug (YTB)	Duda class	Bei-Tuo 681	North Tug 681	北拖 681	?	? t	North Sea Fleet	Active
Duda class large harbor tug (YTB)	Duda class	Bei-Tuo 685	North Tug 685	北拖 685	?	? t	North Sea Fleet	Active
Duda class large harbor tug (YTB)	Duda class	Bei-Tuo 769	North Tug 769	北拖 769	?	? t	North Sea Fleet	Active
Duda class large harbor tug (YTB)	Duda class	Dong-Tuo 874	East Tug 874	东拖 874	?	? t	East Sea Fleet	Active
Duda class large harbor tug (YTB)	Duda class	Dong-Tuo 876	East Tug 876	东拖 876	?	? t	East Sea Fleet	Active
Duda class large harbor tug (YTB)	Duda class	Dong-Tuo 878	East Tug 878	东拖 878	?	? t	East Sea Fleet	Active
Duda class large harbor tug (YTB)	Duda class	Dong-Tuo 879	East Tug 879	东拖 879	?	? t	East Sea Fleet	Active
Duda class large harbor tug (YTB)	Duda class	Nan-Tuo 172	South Tug 172	南拖 172	?	? t	South Sea Fleet	Active
Duda class large harbor tug (YTB)	Duda class	Nan-Tuo 176	South Tug 176	南拖 176	?	? t	South Sea Fleet	Active
Duda class large harbor tug (YTB)	Duda class	Nan-Tuo 177	South Tug 177	南拖 177	?	? t	South Sea Fleet	Active
