= William Spencer (navigational instrument maker) =

- SBR Logo of Spencer, Browning & Rust
- Born: c. 1751; England
- Died: c. 1816; England
- Occupation: Mathematical Instrument maker
- Known for: Navigational instruments for Spencer & Browning; Spencer, Browning & Rust

William Spencer (c. 1751 – c. 1816) was an English mathematical instrument maker of the 18th and 19th centuries. Spencer entered into a partnership with Samuel Browning to form the company of Spencer & Browning after he apprenticed with instrument maker Richard Rust. When Ebenezer Rust joined the partnership, the resultant firm was known as Spencer, Browning & Rust. The company manufactured navigational instruments for both domestic and international markets.

== Apprenticeship ==
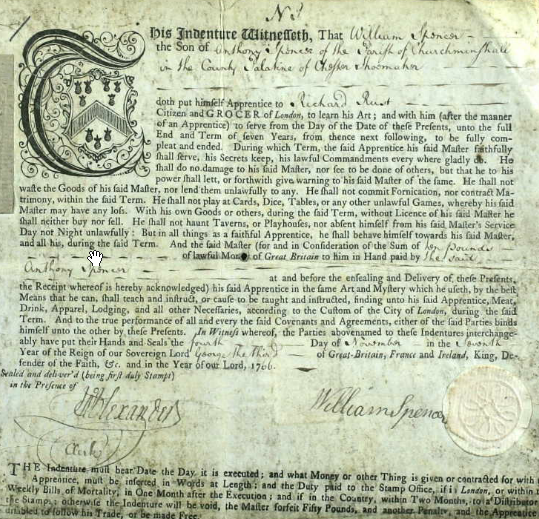
Seven-year contract of indenture of apprentice William Spencer to master Richard Rust, dated 4 November 1766

William Spencer, son of Anthony Spencer, was born in around 1751 in England. On 4 November 1766, at the approximate age of fifteen, William Spencer signed a seven-year contract of indenture (pictured) to Richard Rust, "Citizen and Grocer" of London, England. Grocers referred to a retailer who "traded in gross quantities" and, therefore, encompassed a wide variety of merchants. This included manufacturers and purveyors of mathematical instruments. The contract indicated that his father Anthony Spencer was a shoemaker of the parish of Church Minshull in the County Palatine of Chester, now simply known as Cheshire. In consideration of the sum of ten pounds paid by William's father, Richard Rust agreed to instruct his apprentice, as well as provide him with the necessities of life, including food, drink, clothing, and lodging.

The agreement also outlined a strict code of conduct for the apprentice. Among other things, the contract stipulated that the apprentice could not: "waste the Goods of his said Master, nor lend them unlawfully to any. He shall not commit Fornication, nor contract Matrimony, within the said Term. He shall not play at Cards, Dice, Tables, or any other unlawful Games, whereby his said Master may have any loss. With his own Goods or others, during the said Term, without Licence of his said Master he shall neither buy nor sell. He shall not haunt Taverns, or Playhouses, nor absent himself from his said Master's Service Day nor Night unlawfully."

The agreement also indicated that Richard Rust was responsible for paying a duty to the Stamp Office, usually within one month of the date of the contract. William Spencer's master Richard Rust was a well-known mathematical instrument maker who ran a busy shop on Tower Hill in London. As in this case, a mathematical instrument maker often specialized in navigational instruments. Rust himself had apprenticed, and received his freedom in 1752. In William Spencer's contract of indenture, Richard Rust was referred to as a Grocer. This signified that he was a member of the Grocers' Company. Richard Rust died in around 1785; his will was proved in December 1785.

== Spencer & Browning ==
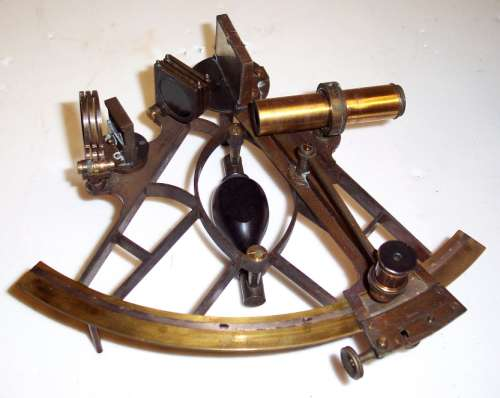
Spencer, Browning & Rust quintant sextant or lattice sextant at the United States Geological Survey Museum

William Spencer and Samuel Browning first formed a partnership between 1778 and 1781. The resultant company of Spencer & Browning manufactured instruments for navigational use. The partners of the firm were also referred to as "optical and mathematical instrument" makers. Both of the partners, William Spencer and Samuel Browning, were members of the Worshipful Company of Grocers, and thus were referred to as Grocers, in addition to instrument makers. Samuel Browning was married to William Spencer's sister Catherine (17 May 1777).

== Spencer, Browning & Rust ==
When Ebenezer Rust joined the partnership of Spencer and Browning in 1784, the firm of Spencer, Browning & Rust was established. The company was in operation in London from 1784 to 1840, initially doing business from 327 Wapping High Street. Later, the firm operated out of 66 Wapping High Street. Spencer, Browning & Rust was a successful company, given the large number of surviving nautical instruments. The firm manufactured a variety of navigational instruments, including octants, sextants, telescopes, and compasses, for both domestic and international markets. Nautical instruments marked with the SBR logo are found in the museums of a number of countries. One of the oldest items in the collection of the United States Geological Survey Museum is a quintant sextant or lattice sextant (pictured) that was manufactured by Spencer, Browning & Rust. The last surviving original partner, Samuel Browning, died in about 1819. The firm continued as Smith, Browning & Rust, operated by relatives of the original partners, until 1840. After the 1838 death of Ebenezer Rust's son Ebenezer Rust, Junior, the firm was renamed Spencer, Browning & Co.

== Family ==
William Spencer and his wife Ann had no children but he was followed in the business by the sons of his brother John Spencer: Samuel, John, Anthony and William Spencer as well the sons of his sister Catherine Spencer (the wife of his partner Samuel Browning): Richard, William and Samuel Browning. William Spencer, died about 1816. The Grocer's will was proved on 20 August 1816.

== See also ==
- John Browning (scientific instrument maker)
