= Fujian-class tanker =

Class of oil tanker

History

PRC
- Status: Active

General characteristics
- Type: Tanker
- Sensors & processing systems: Navigational radar
- Electronic warfare & decoys: None

The Fujian class is a class of naval tankers currently in service with the People's Liberation Army Navy (PLAN), and has received NATO reporting name Fujian class. The exact type designation still remains unknown, and a total of twenty of this class have been confirmed in active service as of early-2020s, both in transport oil tanker and water tanker versions.

Fujian-class ships in PLAN service are designated by a combination of two Chinese characters followed by a three-digit number. The second Chinese character is You (油), meaning oil in Chinese, because these ships are classified as oil tankers. The first Chinese character denotes which fleet the ship is service with, with East (Dong, 东) for East Sea Fleet, North (Bei, 北) for North Sea Fleet, and South (Nan, 南) for South Sea Fleet. However, the pennant numbers are subject to change due to changes of Chinese naval ships naming convention, or when units are transferred to different fleets. Specification:

- Length: 72 meter

Type	NATO designation	Pennant No.	Name (English)	Name (Han 中文)	Commissioned	Displacement	Fleet	Status
Fujian-class transport oil tanker (AOT)	Fujian class	Bei-You 400	North Oil 400	北油 400	?	? t	North Sea Fleet	Active
Fujian-class transport oil tanker (AOT)	Fujian class	Bei-You 561	North Oil 561	北油 561	?	? t	North Sea Fleet	Active
Fujian-class transport oil tanker (AOT)	Fujian class	Bei-You 562	North Oil 562	北油 562	?	? t	North Sea Fleet	Active
Fujian-class transport oil tanker (AOT)	Fujian class	Bei-You 573	North Oil 573	北油 573	?	? t	North Sea Fleet	Active
Fujian-class transport oil tanker (AOT)	Fujian class	Dong-You 630	East Oil 630	东油 630	?	? t	East Sea Fleet	Active
Fujian-class transport oil tanker (AOT)	Fujian class	Dong-You 632	East Oil 632	东油 632	?	? t	East Sea Fleet	Active
Fujian-class transport oil tanker (AOT)	Fujian class	Dong-You 634	East Oil 634	东油 634	?	? t	East Sea Fleet	Active
Fujian-class transport oil tanker (AOT)	Fujian class	Dong-You 635	East Oil 635	东油 635	?	? t	East Sea Fleet	Active
Fujian-class transport oil tanker (AOT)	Fujian class	Dong-You 638	East Oil 638	东油 638	?	? t	East Sea Fleet	Active
Fujian-class transport oil tanker (AOT)	Fujian class	Dong-You 639	East Oil 639	东油 639	?	? t	East Sea Fleet	Active
Fujian-class transport oil tanker (AOT)	Fujian class	Dong-You 650	East Oil 650	东油 650	?	? t	East Sea Fleet	Active
Fujian-class transport oil tanker (AOT)	Fujian class	Nan-You 954	South Oil 954	南油 954	?	? t	South Sea Fleet	Active
Fujian-class transport oil tanker (AOT)	Fujian class	Nan-You 962	South Oil 962	南油 962	?	? t	South Sea Fleet	Active
Fujian-class transport oil tanker (AOT)	Fujian class	Nan-You 965	South Oil 965	南油 965	?	? t	South Sea Fleet	Active
Fujian-class transport oil tanker (AOT)	Fujian class	Nan-You 969	South Oil 969	南油 969	?	? t	South Sea Fleet	Active
Fujian-class transport oil tanker (AOT)	Fujian class	Nan-You 970	South Oil 970	南油 970	?	? t	South Sea Fleet	Active
Fujian-class water tanker (AWT)	Fujian class	Bei-Shui 566	North Water 566	北水 566	?	? t	North Sea Fleet	Active
Fujian-class water tanker (AWT)	Fujian class	Bei-Shui 581	North Water 581	北水 581	?	? t	North Sea Fleet	Active
Fujian-class water tanker (AWT)	Fujian class	Dong-Shui 650	East Water 650	东水 650	?	? t	East Sea Fleet	Active
Fujian-class water tanker (AWT)	Fujian class	Nan-Shui 970	South Water 970	南水 970	?	? t	South Sea Fleet	Active

External image
- Fubai-class tanker Dongyou-640(on the right) and Fujian-class tanker Dongshui-650(on the left) in a joint exercise
- http://eng.mod.gov.cn/xb/News_213114/Photos/16369728_3.html
