= Plotter (instrument) =

In navigational instruments, a plotter is an instrument which marks the position of a vehicle on a map or chart.

== Types ==
Several types of plotters exist. These include manual and electronic plotters:

=== Manual plotters ===
- The parallel rulers plotter
- The triangle
- The Breton plotter

=== Semi-electronic plotters ===
- Yeoman plotter

== See also ==
- Course (navigation)
