= Dupo-class tug =

Class of Chinese naval tugs

History

PRC
- Status: Active

General characteristics
- Class & type: Dupo
- Type: Large harbor tug (YTB)
- Length: 37 m (121 ft 5 in)
- Propulsion: Marine Diesel
- Sensors & processing systems: Navigation radar

The Dupo class is a class of little known large harbor tugs (YTB) built in the People's Republic of China (PRC) for the People's Liberation Army Navy (PLAN). The exact domestic Chinese type designation remain unknown, and this class is identified by its NATO reporting name Dupo class, or 渡泊 in Chinese, meaning Crossing & Mooring.

Specification:

- Length: 37 meters (121 ft 5 in)

The Dupo class in PLAN service is designated by a combination of two Chinese characters followed by three-digit number. The second Chinese character is Tuo (拖), meaning Tug in Chinese. The first Chinese character denotes which fleet the ship is service with, with East (Dong, 东) for East Sea Fleet, North (Bei, 北) for North Sea Fleet, and South (Nan, 南) for South Sea Fleet. However, the pennant numbers may have changed due to the change of Chinese naval ships naming convention. As 2022, nearly a dozen ships have been identified:

Type	NATO designation	Pennant No.	Name (English)	Name (Han 中文)	Commissioned	Displacement	Fleet	Status
Dupo-class large harbor tug (YTB)	Dupo class	Nan-Tuo 192	South Tug 192	南拖 192	?	? t	South Sea Fleet	Active
Dupo-class large harbor tug (YTB)	Dupo class	Various (10+)	Various	Various	?	? t	?	In service & under construction
