= Spencer, Browning & Rust =

- Industry: Navigational instruments
- Predecessor: Spencer and Browning
- Founded: London, England 1784
- Defunct: 1840
- Successor: Spencer, Browning & Co.
- Headquarters: London, United Kingdom
- Key people: William Spencer; Samuel Browning; Ebenezer Rust
- Products: Octants; Sextants; Telescopes; Compasses

Spencer, Browning & Rust was a London firm that manufactured instruments for navigational use during the 18th and 19th centuries. The predecessor company of Spencer and Browning was established by William Spencer and Samuel Browning in 1778, before they entered into partnership with Ebenezer Rust in 1784. After the death of Ebenezer Rust's son, the successor business was known as Spencer, Browning & Co. The firm of Spencer, Browning & Rust made a variety of navigational instruments, including octants and sextants.

== Predecessor ==
William Spencer and Samuel Browning's partnership lasted from 1778 to 1781. The company of Spencer and Browning manufactured instruments for navigational use. The partners of the company were also referred to as "optical and mathematical instrument" makers.

== History ==
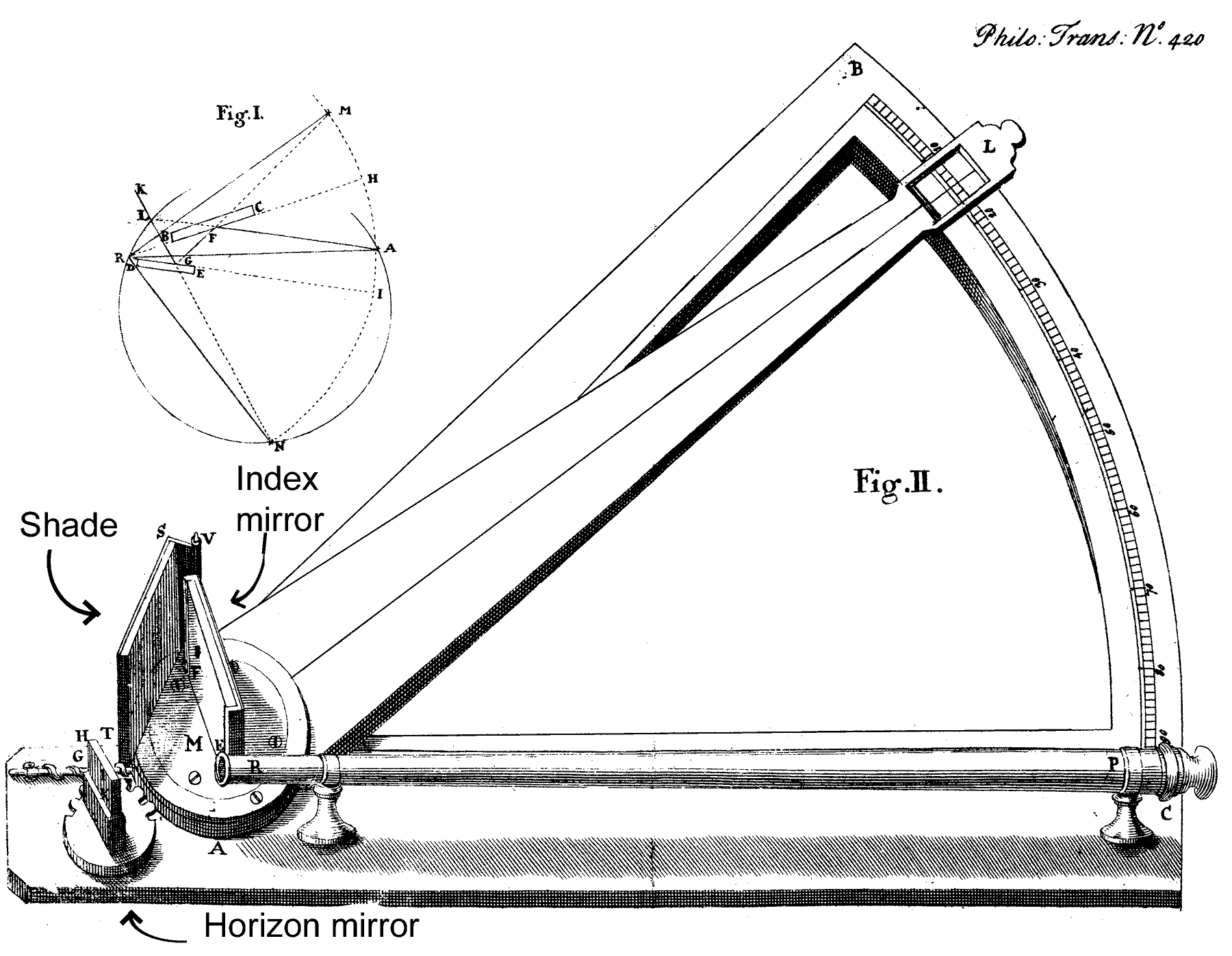
Hadley's first reflecting quadrant (octant)

Diagram of a marine sextant

When Ebenezer Rust joined the partnership of Spencer and Browning in 1784, the firm of Spencer, Browning & Rust was created. It was in operation in London from 1784 to 1840. At first the company did business from 327 Wapping High Street in the London dockside district of Wapping, a neighbourhood of ship chandlers, sailmakers and other nautical trades. Later, the firm operated out of 66 Wapping High Street. The large number of surviving nautical instruments suggests that the company was successful.

There is ample evidence that the firm catered to an international market. Examples of their navigational instruments are found in the museums of a number of countries. There are existing octants that have had the phrase "à Londres" added to the company name. In addition, a 1796 portrait of a German sea captain, painted in Spain, depicts him with an octant that has the Spencer, Browning & Rust name. There is also evidence that Swedish seafarers used SB&R octants. Not only were the initials "SBR" found on the company's instruments, it was found on the instruments of associated (including successor) firms, as well as those produced by manufacturers elsewhere in England, Scotland, and the United States. Spencer, Browning & Rust would deliver divided instruments to those other manufacturers, who would then assemble the components and offer them for sale.

Spencer, Browning & Rust manufactured a variety of navigational instruments, including octants, sextants, telescopes, and compasses. One of the earliest instruments for nautical use was the quadrant; this was followed by the octant. Also referred to as a reflecting quadrant or Hadley quadrant, the octant had small mirror(s) that permitted alignment of the reflected image of the sun with the horizon. It was easier to use than the Davis quadrant and thus generally had fewer errors. While Sir Isaac Newton (1642–1727) invented the principle of the octant, it was two other men who developed the octant independently, one in England and the other in America. The octant was patented by English mathematician John Hadley (1682–1744) in 1734, and soon thereafter was utilized by most British navigators. American optician Thomas Godfrey (1704–1749) developed the octant about the same time in Pennsylvania. Also among the nautical instruments that the company of Spencer, Browning & Rust made were sextants. Developed later than the octant, in 1759, the sextant (pictured) was utilized to measure the altitude of a star or other object in the sky. The measurement then allowed the user to determine his geographical position.

== William Spencer ==
William Spencer (c.1751–1816), son of Anthony Spencer, was an apprentice to Richard Rust. The contract of indenture to Richard Rust, "citizen and grocer of London," was for a term of seven years, and was dated 4 November 1766. London instrument maker William Spencer and his wife Ann had no children but his nephews, Samuel, John, and William Spencer, were apprenticed at the firm and some sources have assumed erroneously they were his sons. William Spencer first formed a partnership with Samuel Browning and then also with Ebenezer Rust in 1784. Samuel Browning was also married to Williams sister (Catherine Spencer), the sons of Samuel and Catherine Browning were also apprenticed at the firm (Richard, William and Samuel Browning). William Spencer, died in 1816 and his will was proved on 20 August 1816,

== Samuel Browning ==
Samuel Browning (c.1752–c.1819) was apprenticed to Richard Rust in 1768. Browning was the first of a line of instrument makers; his sons were Samuel, John, and Richard. His brother John was also the head of a line of instrument makers, and the great-grandfather of John Browning, renowned inventor and manufacturer of scientific instruments. Samuel Browning first formed a partnership with William Spencer, and then also with Ebenezer Rust in 1784.

== Ebenezer Rust ==
Ebenezer Rust, son of Joseph Rust, was an apprentice to Richard Rust (died 1785), and most probably his nephew. Richard Rust was a renowned mathematical instrument maker in Ratcliff and Wapping, London, and the first of a line of English instrument makers. Richard Rust was master to a number of apprentices, including William Spencer, Samuel Browning, and Ebenezer Rust. The seven-year contract of indenture of Ebenezer Rust to Richard Rust was dated 6 March 1770. On 5 April 1770, Richard Rust, "Citizen & Grocer of London" paid a fee for the indenture of Ebenezer Rust, who was then freed from his apprenticeship in 1777, and joined the partnership of Spencer and Browning in 1784. Ebenezer Rust, Senior, was then in turn master to his son Ebenezer, Junior, who apprenticed with him. The seven-year contract of indenture referred to the elder Ebenezer as a "mathematical instrument maker" and as a "Citizen and Grocer of London." The contract was dated 3 September 1795. However, Ebenezer, Senior, died before the end of the term of the contract, in 1800.

== Successor ==
All of the original partners of Spencer, Browning & Rust had died by 1819. The firm was succeeded by Spencer, Browning & Co. in 1840, following the 1838 death of Ebenezer Rust, Junior, son of the original partner. The successor company was in business until 1870.

== Smithsonian National Museum of American History ==
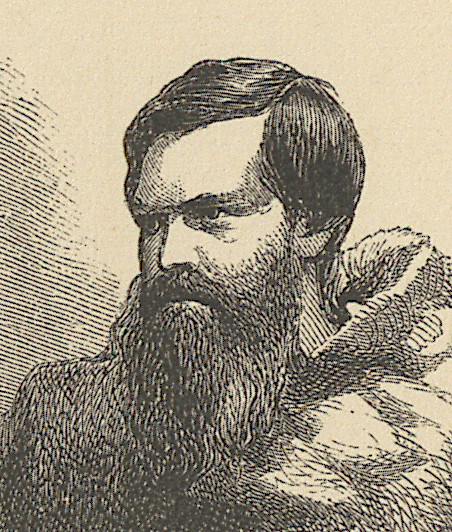
Arctic explorer Charles Francis Hall owned a Spencer, Browning & Rust sextant.

The Smithsonian Institution houses four navigational instruments manufactured by Spencer, Browning & Rust in its National Museum of American History. The items include two sextants, an octant, and a telescope. American Arctic explorer Charles Francis Hall (1821–1871) owned one of the sextants. It is believed that this brass sextant was most probably with him on 30 August 1871. On that day, Hall (pictured) had arrived at the furthest northern point achieved by an explorer to date. The box containing the sextant has several inscriptions: "Captain Halls Quadrant – To be given to his family" and "To the Honorable George M. Robeson, U.S. N., Secretary to the Navy" and "from William Reid." This sextant and a second in the collection are both inscribed: "Spencer Browning & Rust London."

A third item in the collection is an octant made of brass, ebony, and ivory, probably manufactured about 1800. It is inscribed: "Spencer Browning & Rust London" and "SBR" and was owned at one time by Mount St. Mary's University in Emmitsburg, Maryland, United States of America. The fourth object in the museum's collection is a mahogany and brass telescope which dates from the early nineteenth century. The telescope features an achromatic objective, as well as an adjustable brass cap over the objective. There is an erecting eye piece. The body, constructed of mahogany, has a single brass draw tube. The telescope is inscribed: "Spencer Browning & Rust London" and "Day or Night."

== Other museums ==
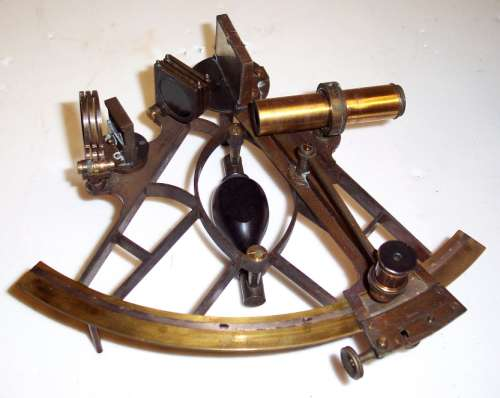
Spencer, Browning & Rust quintant sextant or lattice sextant at the United States Geological Survey Museum

One of the oldest items in the collection of the United States Geological Survey Museum is a quintant sextant or lattice sextant (pictured) that was manufactured by Spencer, Browning & Rust. The sextant dates from the 1820s to 1850s. The Rosenfeld Collection at Mystic Seaport, The Museum of America and the Sea, Mystic, Connecticut, United States of America gives the details of numerous octants made by Spencer, Browning & Rust, and predecessors or successors of the company. The Powerhouse Museum in Sydney, Australia has an ebony octant manufactured by Spencer, Browning & Rust. It features an ivory scale and a double silvered horizon mirror and is on display in the Boulton and Watt Exhibition.

The Royal Ontario Museum in Toronto, Ontario, Canada has in its Sigmund Samuel Gallery an octant (also known as a Hadley quadrant or reflecting quadrant) from Spencer, Browning & Rust. Composed of brass, ebony, and bone, it was owned by William Eason Humphreys. There is a second instrument in the Royal Ontario Museum that is thought to have probably been made by Spencer, Browning & Rust as well. It is a brass, ebony, and ivory sextant that was presented to the museum by the Sigmund Samuel Endowment Fund.

== Auctions ==
On 24 March 2007, an octant manufactured by Spencer, Browner, & Rust was sold for $2,500 at the Science & Technology Auction held in Boston, Massachusetts, United States of America.

== See also ==
- William Spencer (navigational instrument maker)
- John Browning (scientific instrument maker)
