= John Browning (scientific instrument maker) =

- John Browning c.1831 – 1925
- Born: c. 1831; Kent, England
- Died: 14 December 1925 (aged c. 94); Cheltenham, Gloucestershire, England
- Occupations: Inventor, manufacturer
- Known for: Precision scientific instruments

John Browning (c. 1831 – 14 December 1925) was an English inventor and manufacturer of precision scientific instruments in the 19th and early 20th centuries. He hailed from a long line of English instrument makers and transformed the family business from one dealing in nautical instruments to one specialising in scientific instruments. Browning was particularly well known for his advances in the fields of spectroscopy, astronomy, and optometry.

== Background ==
John Browning was born around 1831 in Kent, England, the city recorded variously as Bexley or Welling. His father, William Spencer Browning, was a maker of nautical instruments. It has been speculated that his shop inspired that of the character Solomon Gills, the ship's instrument maker, in the 1848 novel Dombey and Son by Charles Dickens. John Browning hailed from a long line of English instrument makers. His great-grandfather was instrument maker John Browning, brother of Samuel Browning, of the firms Spencer & Browning and Spencer, Browning & Rust, manufacturers of navigational instruments. The latter firm was in operation in London from 1784 to 1840, and was succeeded by the firm of Spencer, Browning & Co. Several sources indicate that John Browning's great-grandson John Browning resided in Sevenoaks, Kent.

== Choice of profession ==
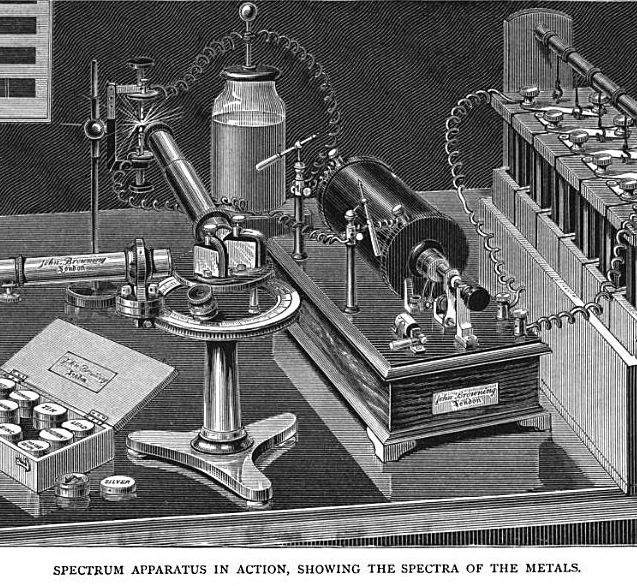
Spectrum apparatus of John Browning

John Browning initially intended to follow the medical profession, and entered Guy's Hospital, a teaching hospital and the location of a school of medicine. Despite having passed the required examinations, however, he abandoned his plans due to ill health. Instead, he apprenticed with his father, William Spencer Browning. At the same time, in the late 1840s, he was also a student at the Royal College of Chemistry. When John Browning came of age, he joined his father in the family business. However, he decided to change the nature of the business, due to increasing competition in the making of nautical instruments. Instead, he elected to pursue the design and manufacture of scientific instruments. In 1856, he assumed sole ownership of the enterprise. The factory was at 111 Minories, London for decades; it moved to 63 Strand, London in 1872. There was an additional London workshop at 6 Vine Street. John Browning's choice of profession was somewhat unusual for a graduate of the Royal College of Chemistry. Those who were inclined to become entrepreneurs tended to enter more chemically-oriented businesses, or have been associated with them before matriculating.

== Scientific instruments ==
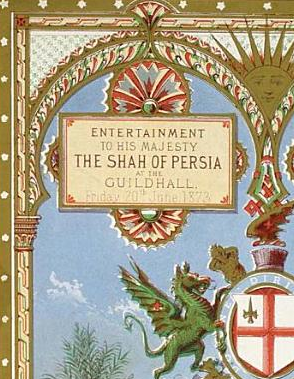
Section of 1873 Guildhall menu

Between 1856 and 1872, Browning acquired provisional patents for designs of numerous scientific instruments. He was also the recipient of an award at the 1862 International Exhibition held in London. He was recognised for his temperature-compensated aneroid barometer. Browning's scientific instruments were used in physics, chemistry, and biology. The products he designed and manufactured included spectroscopes, telescopes, microscopes, barometers, photometers, cameras, ophthalmoscopes, and electrical equipment such as electric lamps.

John Browning installed the first electric light in London, the occasion being a banquet to honour the Shah of Persia during his visit to Queen Victoria. The location was the Guildhall, which has been used as a town hall in the City of London for hundreds of years and continues to be the home of the City of London Corporation. One light, run with Bunsen cells, was positioned outside each window, due to the fumes. The operating cost of each light was £3 per hour. Naser al-Din Shah Qajar was the Shah of Persia during the second half of the nineteenth century. During his reign, he toured Europe three times, in 1873, 1878, and 1889. It was during the 1873 trip that the mayor and the Corporation of the City of London gave a banquet in the Shah's honour. Prime Minister William Ewart Gladstone arranged for the queen to entertain the Shah during the 1873 visit. Queen Victoria did not attend the banquet of 20 June 1873, which was primarily a business occasion. The elaborate preparations for the banquet included not only the costly lighting scheme, but also a gilded, illustrated menu (pictured).

== Spectroscopes ==
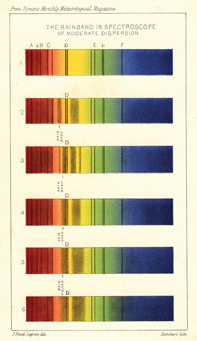
J. Rand Capron rainband spectrum published in the second (1882) edition of How to Work With the Spectroscope

John Browning was perhaps best known as the leading manufacturer of spectroscopes. His were considered to be of the highest quality in England. In 1865, he supplied photographer William Henry Fox Talbot (1800–1877) with a custom-made spectroscope. His crafting of fine spectroscopes strengthened his connection to the field of chemistry. In April 1872, Browning exhibited one of his spectroscopes at the Royal Society, more formally known as the Royal Society of London for Improving Natural Knowledge. In his 1878 book How to Work With the Spectroscope: A Manual of Practical Manipulation With Spectroscopes of All Kinds, John Browning provided an overview of the field of spectroscopy, and the book became well known among spectroscopists. It has been published in a number of editions, most recently on 3 June 2010 by Cambridge University Press.

While the first edition of 1878 contained only black and white images, the second edition of How to Work With the Spectroscope included one notable colour illustration (pictured). It was of the rainband spectrum by lawyer and scientist John Rand Capron. It first appeared as a black and while image in Symons's Monthly Meteorological Magazine. However, the second, 1882 edition of John Browning's handbook reproduced the plate in colour. It demonstrated Joseph von Fraunhofer's solar lines A-F, with the rainband adjacent to the D lines. In the late 19th century, scientists were interested in the rainband for its potential in the detection of atmospheric water vapour and, therefore, the prediction of rain. Evaluation of the rainband represented the first attempt to use spectroscopy in the field of meteorology. Scottish astronomer Charles Piazzi Smyth supported the contention that water vapour bands could be used to predict rainfall in the 22 July 1875 issue of Nature. While the topic of the rainband and its use in meteorology was controversial, John Browning (and his competitors) manufactured pocket spectroscopes designed to show the rainband and marketed them as meteorological tools.

== Royal Astronomical Society ==
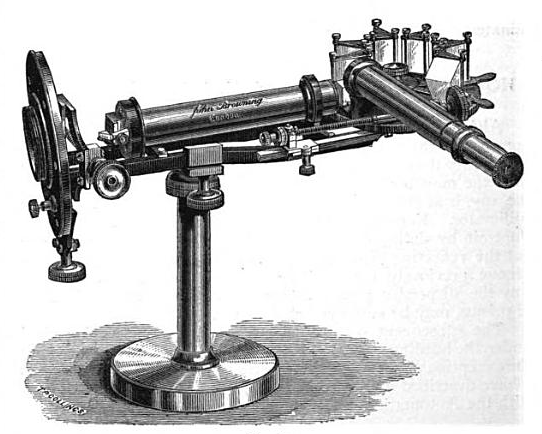
Solar automatic spectroscope of John Browning, to be used with telescopes

An astronomer, Browning was also Optical and Physical Instrument Maker to Her Majesty's Government. As such, he supplied telescopes to the Royal Observatory in Greenwich. Browning also attached spectroscopes to telescopic equipment, garnering the attention of astronomical physicists J. Norman Lockyer and William Huggins. He was elected to the Royal Astronomical Society in 1865. Browning was a pioneer in the manufacture of reflecting telescopes and bringing them to the attention of astronomers. As the popularity of astronomy grew during the 19th century, his business in telescopes flourished. An advocate of the Newtonian reflector, he was the author of A Plea for Reflectors, Being a Description of the New Astronomical Telescopes With Silvered-glass Specula, first published in 1867. By 1876, the book was in its sixth printing. Browning wrote many articles for the Monthly Notices of the Royal Astronomical Society, including a series on Jupiter's equatorial belt about 1870. Browning was a perfectionist, a trait that in at least one instance had unfortunate consequences. When he delayed in providing Lockyer with a spectroscope until it performed to his high standards, Lockyer missed the opportunity of being the first astronomer to observe a prominence on the uneclipsed sun. While the delay was only partially responsible for Lockyer's missed opportunity, there is evidence that Browning long regretted his reluctance to part with the spectroscope in question. Browning made a number of instruments for Lockyer, among them an 8-inch reflecting telescope that was delivered to Lockyer in 1871 and now greets visitors near the main door of the Norman Lockyer Observatory in Sidmouth, Devon. Toward the late 1860s, in his quest to produce telescopes for a growing market, Browning collaborated with George Henry With (1827–1904), former schoolmaster at the Blue Coat School in Hereford. With was talented at producing high quality, large reflecting mirrors.

== British Optical Association ==
Diagram of the eye in Our Eyes (1883)

By the early 1870s, practical optics had become John Browning's primary interest, and he listed his occupation as optician on the census records from 1871 to 1901. He was well known among London's ophthalmic surgeons for his various ophthalmic instruments. Browning had a large part in reforming the art of crafting spectacles. Employees of his company tested people's eyesight and made eyeglasses for them. John Browning was the author of the book, How to Use Our Eyes and How to Preserve them by the Aid of Spectacles. Published in 1883, the book included thirty-seven illustrations, including a diagram demonstrating the anatomy of the eye (pictured). In 1895, he was one of the founders of the British Optical Association, the first professional and examining organisation for optometry. He was not only its first president, but also registered as its first member, so that many consider him to be the first professional optometrist.

== Other professional organisations ==
Browning was also a member of The Aeronautical Society of Great Britain. In 1871, he constructed the first wind tunnel, located in Greenwich at Penn's Marine Engineering Works. It had been designed by another member of the Aeronautical Society, British engineer Francis Herbert Wenham. He was also a member of other scientific organisations, such as the Microscopical Society of London, the Meteorological Society, and the Royal Institution.

== Marriage and family ==
St Mary the Virgin Church in Lewisham, Kent, c. 1811

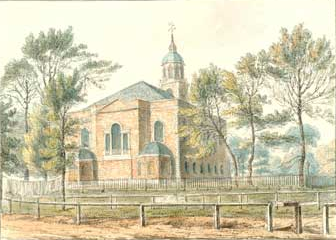
Church of Holy Trinity, Clapham

Based on census and marriage records, John Browning married at least three times. In 1871, Browning lived in Richmond, Surrey with three unmarried sisters. Browning is identified as married, but no wife or child is recorded. His occupation is identified as "optician, master (employing 61 workpeople)." On 18 February 1874, a widowed Browning married widow Charlotte Hotten, née Stringer, at St Mary's Church in Lewisham, Kent. His wife Charlotte, a resident of Lewisham, was the daughter of William Stringer. Browning's father was recorded as William Browning (deceased). Both his occupation and that of his father were listed as optician. In 1881, John Browning was in residence at Croydon in Surrey. He lived with his wife Charlotte, sister Emma, and daughter Maria Browning, as well as stepdaughters Florence and Gertrude Hotten. John Browning's profession was listed as "master optician employing 20 men." He was widowed in 1888, his wife Charlotte dying on 13 March 1888 in Croydon.

Widower John Browning remarried on 24 July 1890 at the Holy Trinity Church, Clapham, on Clapham Common London, at the time recorded as Surrey. He married Annie Woolley, a spinster whose place of birth and residence at the time of their marriage was Chapel Hill in Monmouthshire, Wales. She was the daughter of Josiah Woolley, a licensed victualler, and his wife Harriet Woolley. Her age was listed as 25 years old, thirty years younger than that recorded for her husband. Their marriage record and John Browning's death record are most probably responsible for the difference in dates of birth cited for John Browning in a variety of publications. The marriage record suggests that he was born around 1835, with a given age of 55 at marriage, while his death record suggests that his birth occurred about 1831. Browning's father was listed as William Browning (deceased), with his profession that of optician. John Browning's occupation was also listed as optician. In 1891, the year following their marriage, John and Annie Browning resided in Clapham, with his profession again recorded as optician. The Church of Holy Trinity, Clapham was added to the National Heritage List for England on 14 July 1955 as a Grade II* listed building.

== Retirement and death ==
The company of W. Watson & Son, opticians and camera makers, was founded in London in 1837. In 1900, that company took over John Browning & Co. From 1908, the latter company was known as Watson & Sons Ltd. By 1901, John Browning and his wife had moved to Bournemouth in Hampshire, and a one-year-old daughter Minnie was now part of the family. John Browning's occupation was listed as "refractionist and optician (retired)". John Browning retired from his profession by 1905, and moved to Chislehurst on the outskirts of London, by some accounts. However, his obituary by the Royal Astronomical Society indicates that he retired to Cheltenham, Gloucestershire. He died in the registration district of Cheltenham, Gloucestershire in 1925, with his death registered in the fourth quarter of the year. He was survived by his wife and his daughter, who was chief librarian at Bradford Library. Browning's widow Annie died on 18 February 1932 in Cheltenham.

== See also ==
- Charles Piazzi Smyth
- Francis Herbert Wenham
- Fraunhofer lines
- John Rand Capron
- William Spencer (navigational instrument maker)
