= Timpani Records =

French classical music record label

Timpani is a French classical music record label established in 1990 by Stéphane Topakian. The label issued over 200 discs over 20 years, mainly of unknown 20th Century French classical music. The label and catalogue are now distributed by Naïve Records. In addition to French composers the label also released recordings for the French Wilhelm Furtwängler Society. In 2018, the label slipped into insolvency, and their website went up for sale.

== Notable recordings ==
Almost the entire catalogue of Timpani consists of recording premieres. Among the most recognised releases were:

- Pierné: Cydalise et le Chèvre-pied - disque de l’année Midem Awards
- Ropartz: Le Pays (opera)
- Jean Cras: Polyphème (opera)
- Honegger Complete Chamber Music
- Furtwängler: Violin Sonata No. 2
