= Gunkholing =

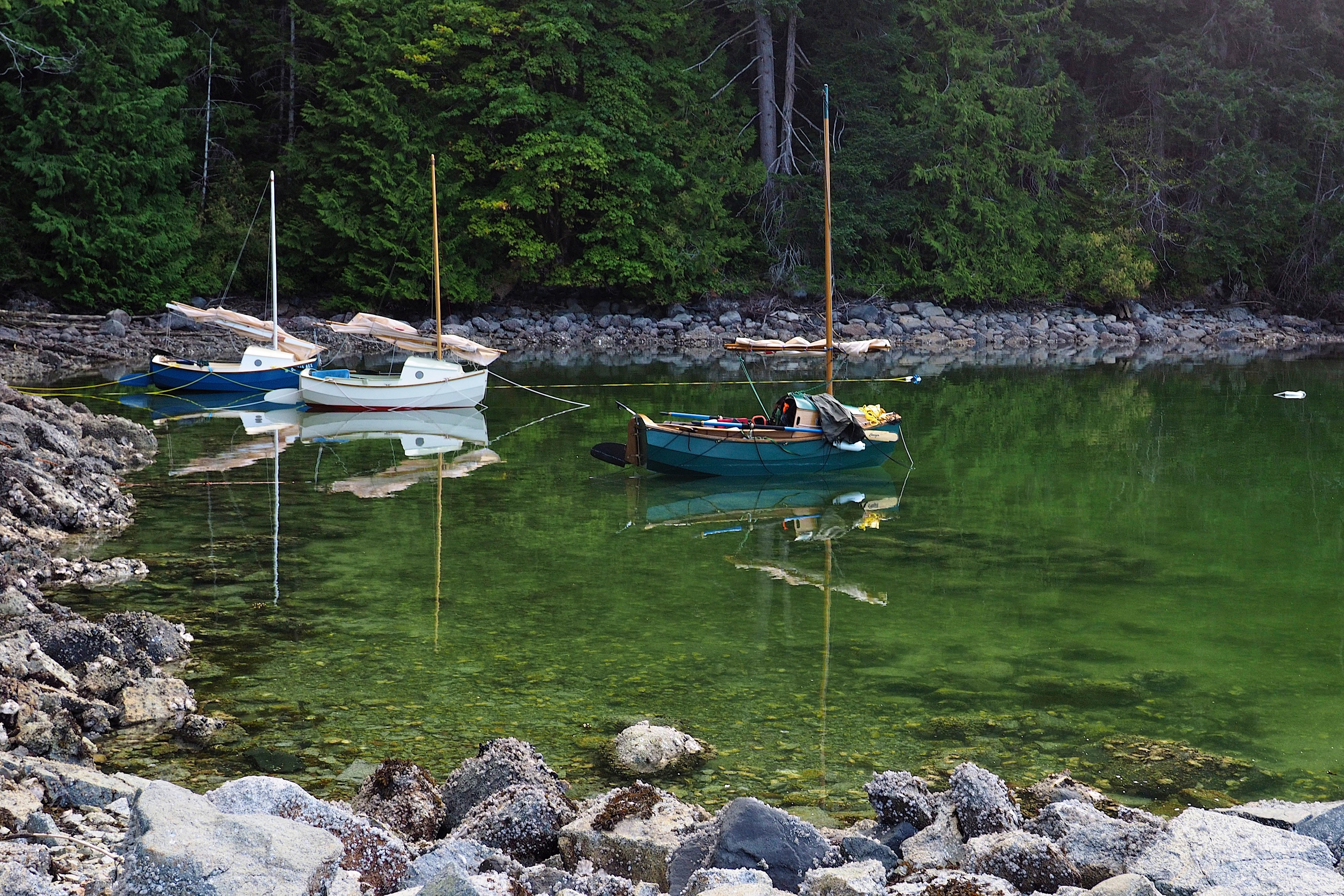
Boats in shallow water on Cortes Island, British Columbia

Gunkholing is a boating term referring to a type of cruising in shallow or shoal water, meandering from place to place, spending the nights in coves. The term refers to the gunk, or mud, typical of the creeks, coves, marshes, sloughs, and rivers that are referred to as gunkholes. While not necessary, gunkholers typically seek out the serenity of isolated anchorages over the crowds of marinas and popular bays, and a minimal draft is preferred, since gunkholers tend to go as far up and into the gunkholes as possible, seeking ever more inaccessible destinations.

Not all boating locales make for good gunkholing. The many inlets, bays, and rivers in places like the San Juan Islands (an archipelago in the Pacific Northwest of the United States between the U.S. state of Washington and Vancouver Island, British Columbia, Canada) and the Inside Passage, (a route that extends from southeastern Alaska in the United States, through western British Columbia in Canada, to northwestern Washington state in the States) can make for ideal gunkholes, as opposed to the relatively inaccessible coastlines of Southern California and Baja. Other locales well-suited to gunkholing include the Intracoastal Waterway, the Sacramento–San Joaquin River Delta, the New York State Canal System, the Chesapeake Bay, the Great Lakes and the many canals and rivers in Ontario.

== International ==
Although comparatively little is written in English on gunkholing outside North America, there has long been considerable interest in many regions around the world. The Caribbean and Central American coasts are famous for gunkholing opportunities and have been portrayed in a great deal of literature, including Ernest Hemingway's "Islands in the Stream." The sparsely populated coastline of southern Chile, with its thousands of remote islands and numerous channels, fjords, and coves, is an area that is seeing increasing gunkholing activity, particularly by sea-kayakers.

In the United Kingdom, gunkholing is colloquially referred to as creek crawling, and administrative bodies including the Royal Yachting Association appear to use this term.
