= Evans Starzinger and Beth Leonard =

Evans Starzinger and Beth Leonard are American blue-water cruising sailors known for long-distance offshore voyages and circumnavigations.

== Sailing career ==
In the 1990s, Starzinger and Leonard completed a circumnavigation aboard a Shannon 37-foot ketch, following the typical tropical route and rounding the Cape of Good Hope.

They later undertook a second circumnavigation aboard Hawk, a custom-built 47-foot aluminum fractional sloop designed by Van de Stadt. The voyage included sailing above the Arctic Circle and around the five great capes: Cape Horn, the Cape of Good Hope, Cape Leeuwin, South West Cape, Tasmania, and South West Cape, New Zealand. The passage included a 9,000-mile, 59-day non-stop leg eastward through the Southern Ocean from Puerto Williams, Chile, to Fremantle, Australia.

In 2007, they completed the second circumnavigation, an eastabout voyage of approximately 65,000 miles that passed beneath the great capes and above the Arctic Circle. In 2008, they cruised around Patagonia, the Falkland Islands and South Georgia, and then up the Atlantic in 2009 to St Helena, the Caribbean and back to Chesapeake Bay to return to the same slip from which they started the voyage on Hawk. Since the completion of these two circumnavigations they have been back and forth to Newfoundland and Nova Scotia several times.

Before their first voyage, they both worked for McKinsey & Company, a corporate strategy consulting firm. Between the two voyages, Starzinger was a vice president at General Electric, running an IT business unit and Leonard wrote three books. Starzinger has been the CEO of two start-ups (North Thin Ply Technology and Augmented Reality Labs) and the offshore safety regulations advisor on two US sailing accident investigation panels. Leonard is the editor of Seaworthy magazine and a director of technical services at BoatUS.

== Bibliography ==
Books by Evans Starzinger

- Voyagers Handbook ISBN 978-0-07-143765-3
- Following Seas ISBN 978-1-55949-369-7
- Blue Horizons ISBN 978-0-07-147958-5
