= Polyphème =

1922 opera by Jean Cras

Polyphème is an opera composed by Jean Cras with a libretto based on Albert Samain's 1902 verse play of the same name. It was written by Cras during World War I and was premiered in Paris in 1922, giving Cras a burst of notoriety in the French press. The plot is based on the classical story of Acis and Galatea.

== Content ==
=== Text ===
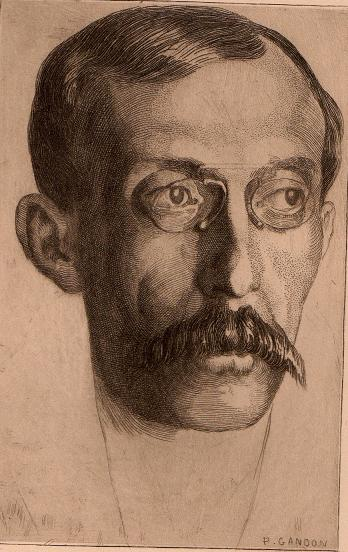
Albert Samain

The text originated as a poetic drama written by Samain in the style of Maurice Maeterlinck. The title character is Polyphemus, who, according to Greek mythology, is the eldest of the Cyclopes and son of Poseidon. It tells the well-known story of Polyphemus's attempt to steal Galatea from Acis. In the original myth, Polyphemus eventually rolls a rock onto the lovers, killing Acis. Samain humanizes Polyphemus, who is portrayed as an oafish but sincere figure who is at ease with children but becomes awkward when trying to communicate with adults. There is no suggestion that he is not fully human (the text clarifies that he has two eyes), but he is portrayed as a morose and solitary forest dweller who hopelessly yearns for love. Eventually he becomes aware of the feelings shared by the two lovers and, though he looms over them with a heavy boulder, decides not to crush them. Ultimately, the cyclops put his eyes out like Oedipus and wanders into the sea to find death because the couple's happiness together horrifies him.

=== Composition ===
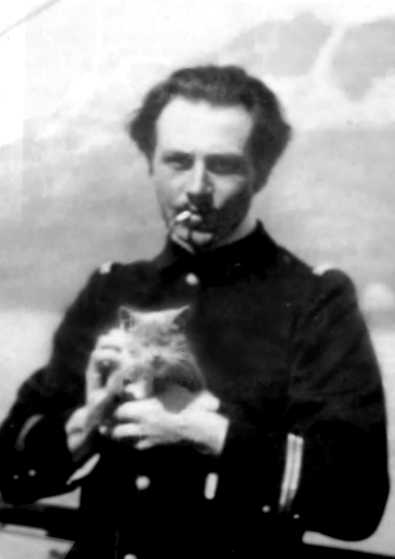
Jean Cras, 1902

Cras encountered Samain's dramatic poem in 1910, ten years after its author's death. He adapted it by dividing it into four rather than the original two acts and slightly pruned the longer speeches. He described the work as a "lyric tragedy" rather than an opera, since there is very little action. The drama proceeds through a series of arcadian pastoral tableaus punctuated by Polyphème's long brooding soliloquies and his obsessive interrogations of Galatée's young brother Lycas.

Cras completed the music in 1914, working on the orchestration while serving in the French navy during the Adriatic campaign of World War I. The music is impressionistic, restless, and highly chromatic, in the spirit of Chausson and Duparc. Polyphème's depression is marked by the use of diminished seventh chords and tortuous figures. The influence of Debussy's La mer and his opera Pelléas et Mélisande is also noticeable, especially in the use of whole-tone scales.

== Premiere ==
The opera won the first Ville de Paris Prize in 1921, and was first performed at the Opéra-Comique in Paris in December 1922. It was conducted by Albert Wolff and directed by Albert Carré. It was revived in 1924.

== Roles ==
- Polyphème – baritone
- Galatée – soprano
- Acis – tenor
- Lycas – contralto
- Un sylvain (forest creature) – tenor
- Une nymphe – soprano
- Pan – (non singing)

== Plot ==
Act 1
Nymphs and swains celebrate the charms of nature. Polyphème feels alienated and embittered because the teenage Galatée no longer loves him as she did when she was a child. He asks Lycas, Galatée's young brother, to describe her feelings. Lycas laments that Galatée no longer plays with him, but spends her time with her lover Acis. Polyphème attempts to rekindle his relationship with Galatée by bringing her gifts, but realises that she has no feelings for him. He frightens her when he blurts out his intense love for her and tries to stop her leaving by force, but he finally lets her go.
Act 2
Galatée describes Polyphème's disturbing behaviour to Acis, who expresses his dislike of Polyphème. Galatée says he is to be pitied. The lovers embrace. Lycas tries to get the lovers to play with him, but they fob him off.
Act 3
Polyphème broods over his own isolation, and forces Lycas to describe the intimacy of the lovers. Polyphème's bitter obsession frightens Lycas, who pleads with him not to hurt Galatée.
Act 4
Acis and Galatée embrace once more and discuss Polyphème's increasingly morose behaviour. The nymphs and swains dance and sing of love. As Acis and Galatée fall asleep in each other's arms, the god Pan appears and blesses the lovers. They wake and renew their devotion to one another. Polyphème appears above them with a rock, overhearing the lovers' romantic intimacies, and feels his own ugliness. He leaves in despair. Acis leaves and Galatée ponders love as she hears a mysterious yell of pain in the forest. She falls asleep. Polyphème arrives, blinded. Lycas helps him to touch the sleeping Galatée for the last time. Polyphème then tells Lycas that he is going to walk into the sea.

== Recording ==
A recording of this opera was released in 2003, with Bramwell Tovey conducting the Luxembourg Philharmonic Orchestra and with Armand Arapian in the title role. It was released by Timpani Records on three CDs.
