= Francis Herbert Wenham =

British marine engineer

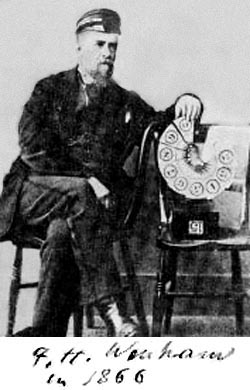
F.H. Wenham in 1866

Francis Herbert Wenham (1824, Kensington – 1908) was a British marine engineer, inventor, and pioneering aeronautical scientist. Best known for his foundational work on the theory of flight and the invention of the wind tunnel, Wenham's research and inventions significantly influenced the development of modern aerodynamics and heavier-than-air flight.

== Early life and background ==
Wenham was born in Kensington, London, the son of a British army surgeon. He developed an early interest in scientific and technical subjects, which would later shape his multifaceted career.

== Aeronautics ==
In 1866, Wenham presented his landmark paper, "Aerial Locomotion," at the inaugural meeting of the Royal Aeronautical Society in London. The paper was later published in the Society's journal and reprinted in influential aeronautical publications in the 1890s, including Octave Chanute's "Progress In Flying Machines". It introduced the idea of superposed wings in a flying machine, a concept that Wenham had tested in 1858 with a five-wing glider, although it did not actually fly. In 1866 he patented the design, which became the basis for biplanes, triplanes and multiplanes that took to the air as gliders in the 1890s, and as airplanes in the early decades of the 20th century. Superposed wings increased the lifting area and avoided the structural problems of excessive wing length.

Wenham first tested superposed wings in 1866 with a model that resembled a Venetian blind, with several bands of stiff paper arranged in parallel rows. This multiplane design aimed to increase the lifting area without excessively increasing wingspan, allowing for greater lift while maintaining manageable structural demands. Wenham tried several variants with some success, then decided to build a machine which could support a man. He tested it in the evening in a strong breeze. He was taken by surprise when, as he wrote, "A sudden gust caught up the experimenter, who was carried some distance from the ground". A monoplane attempt that same year was inconsequential (Flying Machines, 1911).

According to some sources John Stringfellow was influenced by Wenham's works or possibly even by his personal communication when creating his steam engine triplane model aircraft, which was demonstrated publicly at the international exhibition in the Crystal Palace in 1868.

In 1871 Wenham and colleague John Browning designed and constructed what was probably the world's first wind tunnel. This apparatus allowed systematic, repeatable experiments on lift and drag, enabling the scientific study of aerodynamics and influencing research for decades. Their experiments showed that high aspect ratio wings—long and narrow—had a better lift-to-drag ratio than short stubby wings with the same lifting area. Writing about his work, Wenham may have been the first scientist to use the word "aeroplane".

Aviation writer Carroll Gray says Wenham's work may have been an important influence on the Wright brothers:

It is striking to note that at least four significant aerial vehicle design elements suggested by Wenham in 1866 can be seen on the series of successful Wright gliders and on the 1903 Wright Flyer: 1) superimposed wings, 2) vertical upright supports between the superimposed wings, 3) the prone position of the operator, as in Wenham's design with superimposed wings, and 4) that turning in flight ought be accomplished by means of generating more lift on one side of the aerial vehicle than on the other, rather than through the use of a simple rudder. It is also important to restate that Wenham's paper "Aerial Locomotion" was readily available to Wilbur Wright (as well as to Orville) in the 1895 "Aeronautical Annual" which the Smithsonian Institution recommended to Wilbur Wright in June 1899 (along with other aeronautical reading material), and which he soon thereafter obtained and read.

== Other engineering work ==
Aeronautics was Wenham's "spare time" pursuit. In his regular career he designed marine engines, ship's propellers, gas and hot air engines, and high pressure boilers. As an inventor of hot air engines, Wenham followed the principles of George Cayley. He also invented the Wenham gas lamp, which enjoyed a decade or two of popularity before being displaced by electric incandescent lighting. Wenham was highly skilled in the use of microscopes. He published many papers on the subject and designed stands, objective lenses and prisms, fabricating some of the latter himself. He was important in the history of photography, having given Francis Frith invaluable assistance in producing his 1856 photographs in Egypt.

== Personal life ==
Wenham married Alice Rose W. Morton in 1871 and lived in Woking, Surrey, with their children.

== See also ==
- John Browning (scientific instrument maker)
