= Find a Crew =

- Website type: Private
- Available in: English, Italian
- Founded: 1 December 2004; 21 years ago
- Area served: International
- Owner: NAUTYCAL Pty Ltd
- Founder: Raffael Gretener
- Key people: Raffael Gretener (CEO); Knud Nexo (CTO)
- Website: www.findacrew.com
- Registration: Site can be browsed without registering; to sign in registration is required as either a boat or a crew member.
- Launched: December 2004
- Current status: Online

Find a Crew is an international online marine crew and boat portal that offers a database to match boat members with crew.

Find a Crew encompasses professional, commercial and recreational boating providing a platform for members to search for, and communicate with, people travelling, working on or exploring the oceans of the world.

== Main features ==
Find a Crew has a network of members seeking to find a crew or become a crew member in over 200 countries. Website visitors can view member information, but must become registered members to exchange contact information. People that work as crew members may do so as volunteers or companions, where light duties are exchanged for room and board. Other non-sailing positions are involved in food service, teachers or nannies, language interpreters, scientists on research vessels, or water sports instructors. Professional crew members include deckhands, engineers, and skippers. In some cases, nonprofessionals sign on as paying passengers. Crew members do not need to be experienced.

== Membership and site ==
Registration is free of charge, as is searching through matching profiles and showing an initial expression of interest by sending a wave to another member. Members can search for and be matched against other members using many parameters such as gender, age, location, position type, experience at sea and many more.

Members can upload photos to their profile, and personalise it with text sections to provide more information about themselves, what they are offering and what they are expecting. Free members can also reply to any initial contacts they receive with a yes, no or maybe wave. Once mutual interest is established, a subscription fee to become a Premium member is required for further communication. Other services such as a Personal Identity Verification process and increased messaging capabilities are also available to Premium members. Once contact information is exchanged, arrangements such as the duration, location, terms and expectations of the work or travel exchange on board are generally worked out in advance.

== History ==
Find a Crew was launched in December, 2004 to match individuals who wanted to work on boats with boats needing crew. In 2009, Nautycal Pty Ltd was founded as the parent company of Find a Crew and other marine based websites. It is based in Mooloolaba, Queensland. The directors of Nautycal Pty Ltd are Raffael Gretener as the CEO and Knud Nexo as the Chief Technology Officer.
In 2007, Find a Crew became a registered trademark due to being able to demonstrate that the phrase was not used as a searchable phrase prior to December 2004. It has since become a frequently used search phrase by people looking for crew or crew jobs.
