= Van de Stadt =

Van de Stadt is a Dutch surname. Notable people with the surname include:

- E. G. van de Stadt (1910–1999), Dutch yacht designer
- Tim van de Stadt (born 1992), Dutch music producer
