= Yeoman plotter =

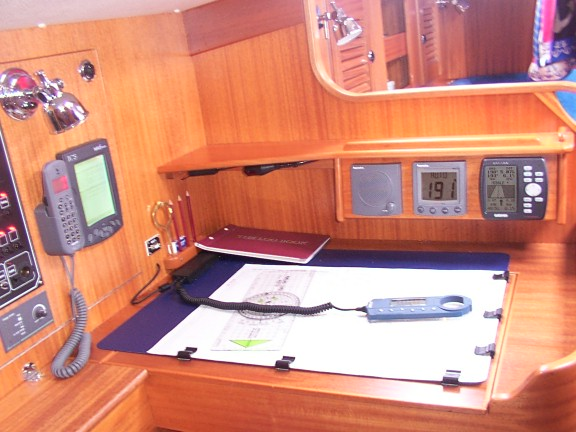
Yacht chart table with a Yeoman Navigator plotter in use, together with a traditional plastic Breton plotter.

The Yeoman Plotter was a plotter used on ships and boats to transfer GPS coordinates or RADAR echo locations onto a paper navigation chart and to read coordinates from the chart. It was manufactured from 1985 to 2014/2015 and was an intermediary step between traditional paper chart navigation and full electronic chart displays. It was easy to understand for people that were accustomed to paper charts and much cheaper than electronic chart displays available at the time. The continuing fall in prices of electronic chart displays, their increase in functionality such as radar overlay and the advent of cheap tablets eventually made the Yeoman plotter uncompetitive.

== Construction ==
The plotter consists of a plotting surface impregnated with fine wires and a moveable "mouse" containing a sensing ring. The mouse's location on the surface can be electronically sensed.

To use the plotter, a conventional paper chart is first fixed in position on the surface (the method of fixing varies between the different models of plotter; see below). It is then "registered" - the mouse is placed over three known points on the chart and a button pressed at each. Knowing the location on the surface of these points, the system can interpolate the mouse's position anywhere on the chart. In the 1990s charts in some countries had plotter reference points printed on them, and the coordinates of these points were pre-programmed in the Yeoman unit. Other charts needed the input of the reference points to be manually added.

Although the device can provide some useful data on its own (positions of charted objects, distances and bearings between points), in practice it is invariably linked to a source of position data such as GPS. This enables many useful features, the most important of which is the fixing on the chart of the vessel's current position. In position mode, four illuminated arrows around a transparent area on the mouse are used. The device is pushed across the chart, following the arrows, until all four of them are extinguished. This indicates that the mouse is directly over the vessel's current position on the chart; if required, a pencil can be poked through a small hole to mark the fix on the chart. After a couple of goes, this procedure becomes instinctive and very fast.

The mouse can also be used to obtain the range and bearing from the vessel's current position to any other object, simply by placing it over that object on the chart and reading the figures from the display. If a suitable radar is fitted it can be combined with the Yeoman plotter for navigation in poor visibility. In one mode, the position of the mouse on the chart is reflected in a cursor on the radar display - the mouse can be placed over a charted object to identify its echo on the radar, which is very useful for objects whose reflection may not be obvious. Similarly, a position from the radar screen can be sent to the Yeoman - the mouse is moved by hand following the illuminated arrows as for plotting a fix, and is guided to the location of the radar return.

== Advantages ==
The way in which the Yeoman plotter combines speedy GPS position fixing with a paper chart is cited as a benefit for two principal reasons. The first is one of safety and reliability - even the best marine electronics fail from time to time, and if the boat's electronic instruments should cease to work then a recent pencil plot on a paper chart becomes extremely valuable. Because such a fix can be made on a Yeoman in around two seconds, it is likely to be updated far more frequently. The fact that the correct chart is guaranteed to be on board, up to date, and open on the chart table ready for reversion to traditional navigation is also an aspect to consider as video chart plotters become more widely used.

The second benefit of the Yeoman plotter over an electronic chart display is cited less often, but to most of its users is the more important - they find it easier to use. While video plotter technology is improving every year, they still must display their charts on relatively small screens, with input via a single small joystick and a few buttons. By contrast, a printed chart on a Yeoman Navigator provides a 35-inch "display" at extremely high resolution, that one can draw on, make notes upon, and use for traditional operations with dividers and rulers, combined with instant (permanent!) position fixes and range-and-bearing information from the Yeoman mouse. This mixing of technology and traditional techniques was quite effective.

== Versions ==
Yeoman made four versions of their plotter for different situations:

Maxi
Designed to be installed on the bridge of large ships, this is a self-contained chart table up to A0 (approximately 33"x47") in size.
Navigator
Regarded as the "normal" Yeoman, this is a 28"x21" pad of mousemat-like material, with a control box attached in one corner and six separate clips to secure the chart or the chart can be alternatively be secured using an option called the ClearView which is a transparent flexible screen under which the chart is inserted. This plotter is designed to be used on the chart table of a yacht, connected to the vessel's GPS system. It can in fact be built into the table if required; a menu setting reverses the position data so that it works properly when glued upside-down to the underneath of the tabletop - the mouse can work accurately through up to two centimeters of timber.
Compact
For the smaller chart table measuring approximately 24" x 20" which has all the same features as the Navigator
Sport
A portable version of the Yeoman designed to be used in the cockpit of yachts or in open boats. It incorporated a waterproof cover for the chart and velcro straps to hold it in place.

The manufacturing rights for Yeoman Plotters were purchased by Precision Navigation Ltd in 2004 and production has been relocated to East Anglia (UK). In 2014 the ownership of Precision Navigation transferred to Charity & Taylor and production ceased.

== See also ==
- Breton plotter

== Sources ==
Yeoman Sport User Manual
