= Breton plotter =

Navigational instrument

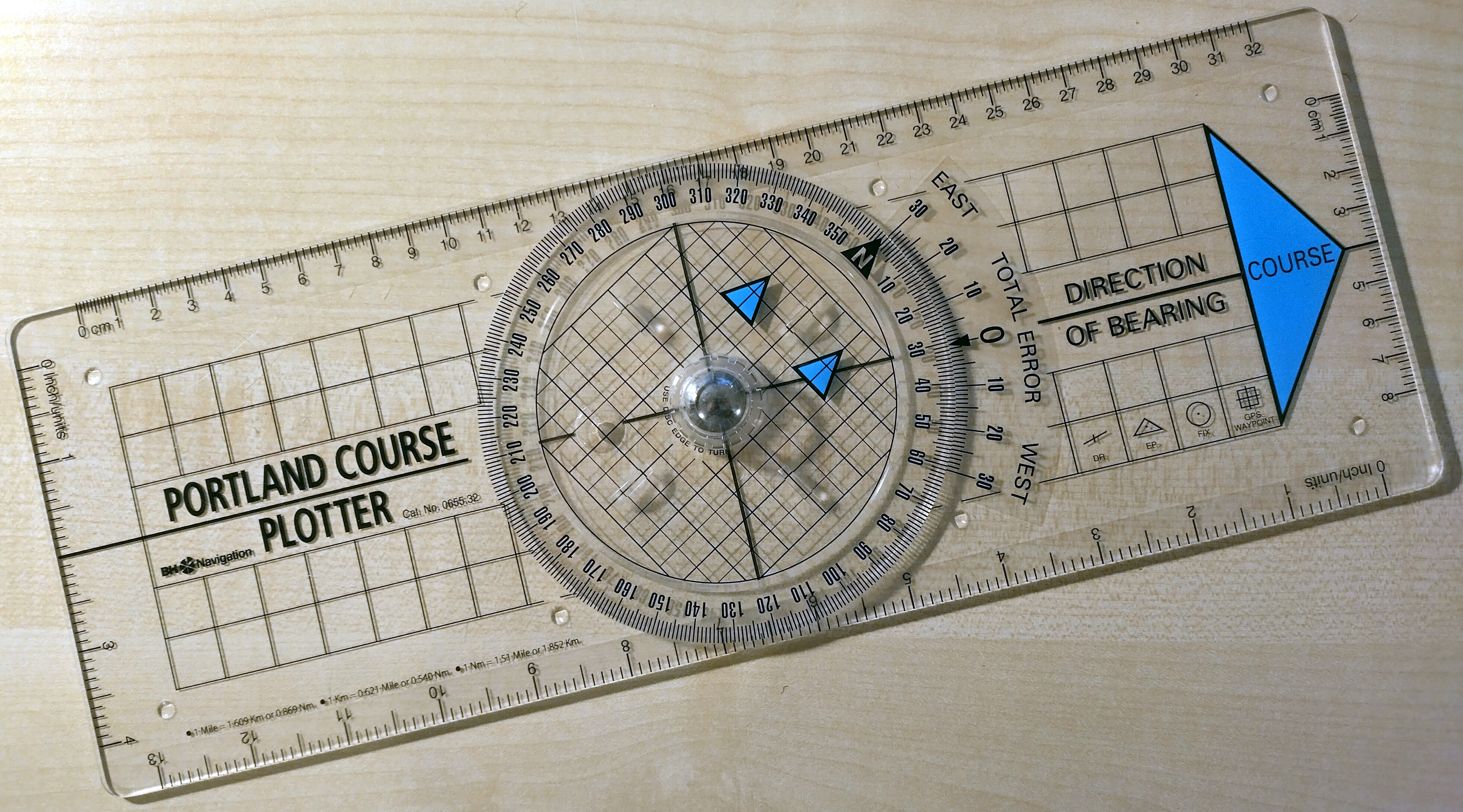
Breton Plotter

A Breton plotter (French: Rapporteur Breton), also known as a Portland course plotter or Weems protractor named after later manufacturers producing similar devices, is a navigational instrument used for nautical navigation with charts.

The Breton plotter contains a ruler with a rotating protractor that serves as a compass rose, allowing navigators to plot a course on charts by aligning the North of the ruler with the North of the chart.

== History ==
The Breton plotter was invented by Captain Yvonnick Gueret, a Breton seaman who developed the plotter during his experiences teaching navigation with a Cras plotter (Règle Cras) by Jean Émile Paul Cras. Gueret was a commander in merchant vessels, served on small fishing boats, delivered private yachts, and later taught navigation. While teaching, he found that students were having trouble using the more complex plotters common at the time, and decided to make his own.

Gueret's device went on the market in 1979 to acclaim from publications including Yachting World. Because he did not patent the plotter, many other manufacturers released their own versions, such as the British Portland Course Plotter. Gueret later extended the use of the plotter to air navigation for small aircraft.
