= Jean Cras =

French composer and naval officer (1879–1932)

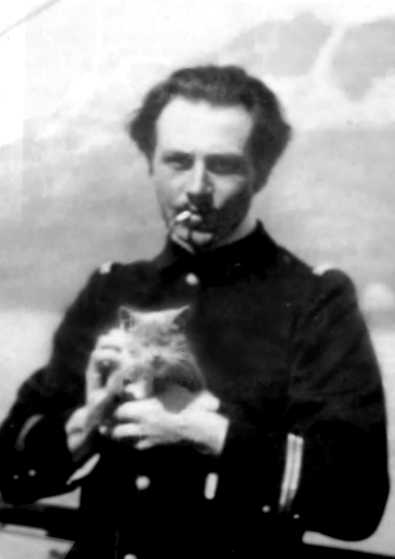
- Jean Cras at sea in his naval uniform with his cat, Bleu-Nial, 1902.
- Born: Jean Émile Paul Cras; 22 May 1879; Brest, France
- Died: 14 September 1932 (aged 53); Brest, France
- Occupations: Naval officer, composer
- Notable work: Polyphème
- Military career
- Allegiance: France
- Branch: Navy
- Rank: Rear Admiral
- Musical career
- Genres: Chamber; Classical

Jean Émile Paul Cras (French: [ʒɑ̃ kʁaz]; 22 May 1879 – 14 September 1932) was a 20th-century French composer and career naval officer. His musical compositions were inspired by his native Brittany, his travels to Africa, and most of all, by his sea voyages. As a naval commander he served with distinction in the Adriatic Campaign during World War I.

== Biography ==
=== Life and naval career ===
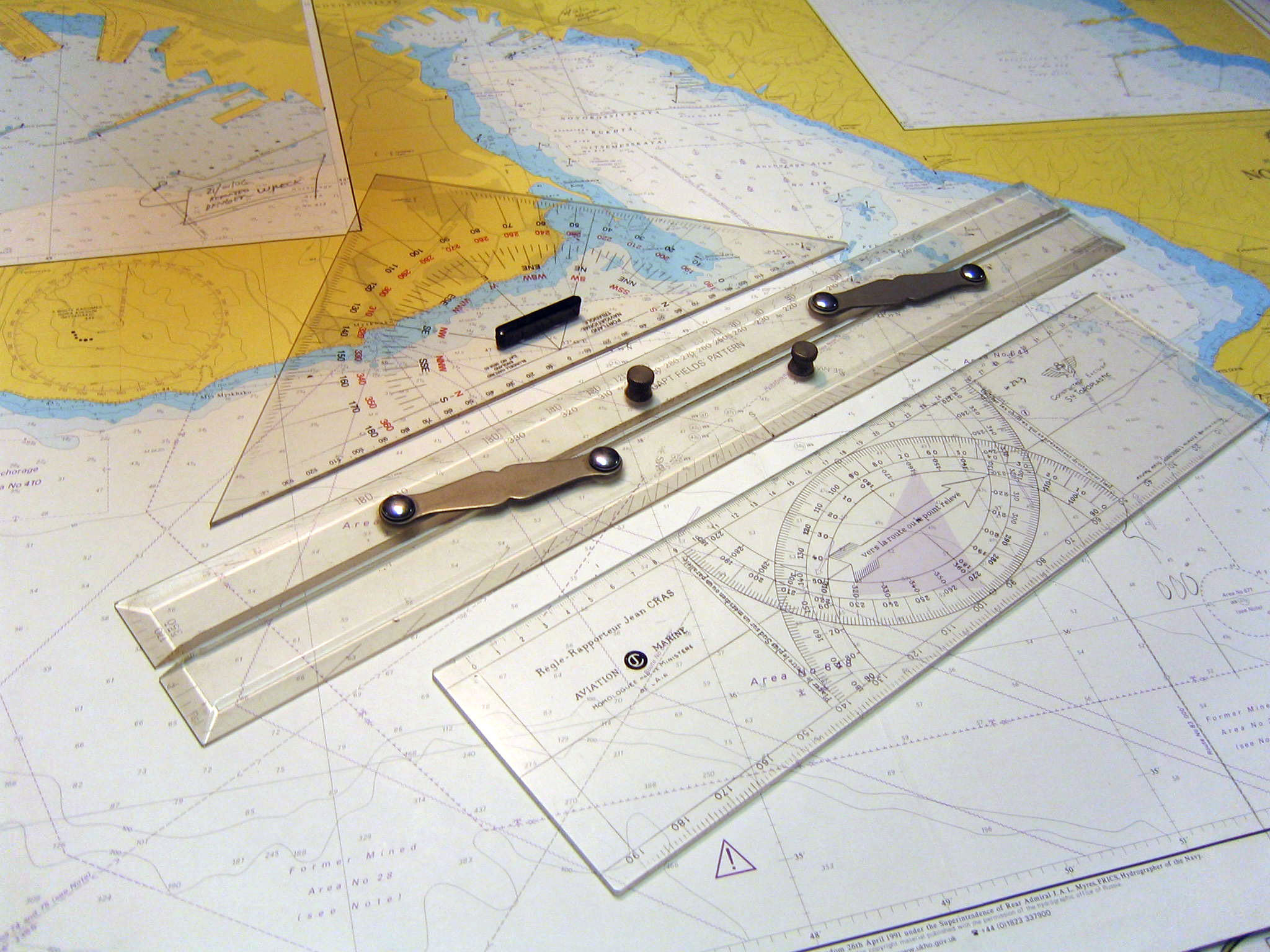
The "Cras Navigation Plotter", foreground, designed by Jean Cras.

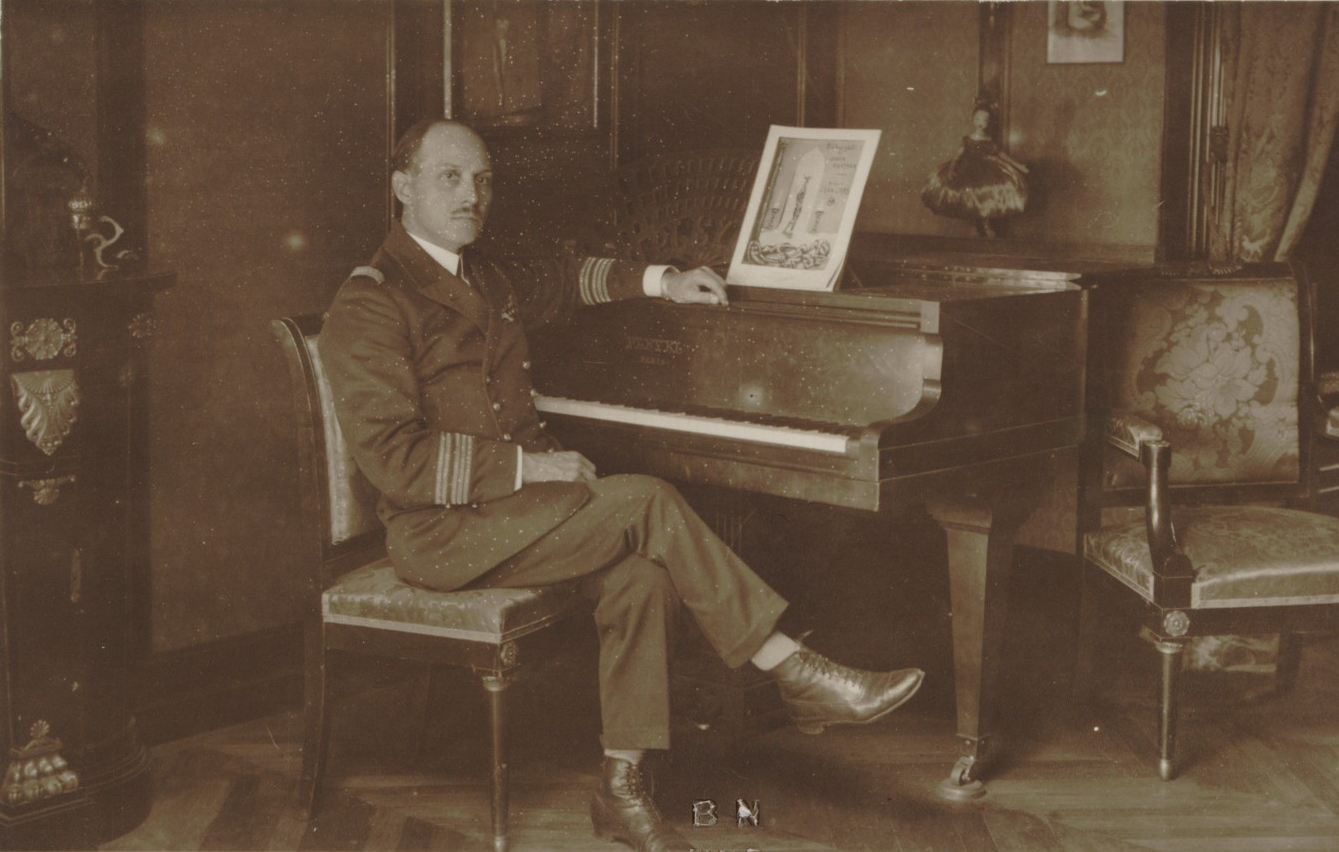
Jean Cras, ship captain, 1930

Cras was born and died in Brest. His father was a naval medical officer. He was accepted into the navy at the age of seventeen. As a midshipman cadet on the French cruiser Iphigénie, he travelled in the Americas, the West Indies and Senegal. He was promoted to Lieutenant in 1908. His mathematical skills led to his proposing a number of innovations in technical practices which were adopted by the navy, including his invention of an electrical selector and a navigational plotter protractor known as Règle Cras (aka Cras ruler, Cras protractor, Cras plotter). (However, it was difficult to operate by some, which inspired the later development of the Breton plotter by Yvonnick Gueret.)

With the outbreak of war in 1914 Cras was appointed as adjutant to Admiral Augustin Boué de Lapeyrère. He later worked in the Submarine Defense Service. In 1916 he was appointed commander of the torpedo boat Commandant Bory. During the Adriatic campaign he sank a submarine and was commended for his bravery in rescuing a sailor who had fallen overboard.

After the war Cras became Chief Secretary to the Chief of General Staff, and was promoted to Commander. He served on several other vessels before being appointed Service Chief on the General Staff for Scientific Research. In 1931 he was appointed Major General of the Port of Brest and promoted to rear admiral. He occupied this position when he died after a short illness.

His daughter, Colette Cras, a concert pianist for whom he wrote his piano concerto, married the Polish-French composer Alexandre Tansman.

=== Musical career ===
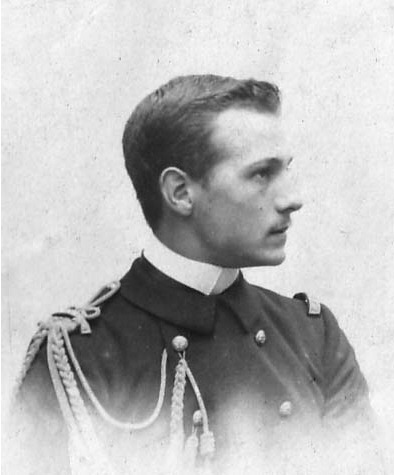
Jean Cras, ca. 1899

Cras met the composer Henri Duparc early in his career and the two became lifelong friends. Duparc called Cras "the son of my soul". Though Cras's duties in the French navy left him little time to devote to his musical work, he continued to compose throughout his life, mainly writing chamber music and songs. Much of his most ambitious work, the opera Polyphème, was written and orchestrated during the war; however, most of his output dates from after the war. Today, his string trio and string quartet are his best known works.

His lyric tragedy Polyphème is considered his masterpiece. The opera was acclaimed at its premiere in 1922, giving Cras a burst of notoriety in the French press. The title character is Polyphemus, who, according to Greek mythology, is the eldest Cyclops and son of Poseidon. It tells the well-known story of the attempt by Polyphemus (baritone) to steal Galatea (soprano) from Acis (tenor). In the original myth Polyphemus eventually kills Acis by rolling a rock onto him. Albert Samain, the librettist, humanized Polyphemus by having him become aware of the feelings shared by two lovers and thus decide not to crush them. Ultimately, the cyclops wanders into the sea to find death because the couple's happiness horrifies him. The music is impressionistic, restless, and highly chromatic, in the spirit of Chausson and Duparc. The influence of Debussy's opera Pelléas et Mélisande is also noticeable. (A recording of this opera was released in 2003, with Bramwell Tovey conducting the Luxembourg Philharmonic Orchestra and Armand Arapian in the title role.)

Cras's later work developed a more acerbic style comparable to that of Béla Bartók, though formally close to César Franck. He considered chamber music to be his forte, writing that "this refined musical form has become for me the most essential". The String Trio in particular integrates a wide range of styles, including North African influences. It was described as a 'miraculous' work by André Himonet in 1932, achieving "perfectly balanced sonority and a plenitude of expression between which one dare not choose." The Trio for Strings and Piano also blends African and Eastern melodic patterns with Breton musical traditions into a coherent whole. The critic Michel Fleury compares his work to the Japonist style of the artist Henri Rivière revealing "a stylised Breton land, as though it had been passed through the sieve of his varied experiences gained in the four quarters of the globe."

== Selected works ==
=== Opera ===
- Polyphème, opera in five acts on a lyric drama by Albert Samain (1910–1918, Ed. Salabert) (f.p. Opéra-Comique, Paris, 29 December 1922.)

Published excerpts:

- No. 1: «Oh ! qui m'enlèvera...», Polyphème: Act III, scene 1, (1921, Senart)
- No. 2: «Il est parti... Pourquoi faut-il que l'heure arrive», Galatée: Act IV, scene 5, (1921, Senart)
- Le Sommeil de Galatée, musical interlude from Act I, (1922, Senart)

=== Vocal compositions ===
- (1892–1896, numerous songs in manuscript, "Album de jeunesse")
- Panis angelicus (August 1899, ms.)
- Sept mélodies, (poems by Rodenbach, Droin, Verlaine, Baudelaire) for voice and piano (1899–1905, Ed. Salabert)
  1. Douceur du soir, poem by Georges Rodenbach (1901)
  2. Mains lasses, poem by Georges Rodenbach (1905)
  3. L'espoir luit, poem by Paul Verlaine (Sagesse III), (1900, 1st ed.; 1909, éd. mutuelle de la Schola Cantorum)
  4. Le Son du cor, poem by Paul Verlaine (Sagesse X), (1900)
  5. Rêverie, poem by Alfred Droin, (1903, 1st ed.; 1909, éd. mutuelle de la Schola Cantorum)
  6. Nocturne, poem by Alfred Droin, (1903, 1st ed.; 1909, éd. mutuelle de la Schola Cantorum)
  7. Correspondances, poem by Charles Baudelaire (1901)
- Ave verum, for voice, violin, organ (or harmonium) (1905, ms.)
- Deuxième messe à 4 voix a capella (1907–1908, ms.)
  1. Kyrie (1907)
  2. Gloria (1907)
  3. Sanctus (1908)
  4. Benedictus (1908)
- Regina coeli, voices with organ (1909, pub. 1914, Ed. Schola Cantorum)
- Ave Maria, for voice with organ (August 1910, ms.)
- Elégies (four poems by Albert Samain), for voice with orchestra (1910, Ed. Durand)
- L'Offrande lyrique (seven poems by Rabindranath Tagore, transl. André Gide), for voice with piano (1920/1921, Ed. Salabert)
- Image (poem by E. Schneider), for voice with piano (1921, Ed. Salabert)
- Fontaines (five poems by Lucien Jacques), for voice & orchestra, or for voice & piano (1923, Ed. Salabert)
- Cinq Robaïyats (five Persian quatrains by Omar Khayyam, transl. Franz Toussaint), for voice with piano (1924, Ed. Salabert)
- Dans la montagne (poems by Maurice Boucher), five chorales for male quartet (1925, Ed. Salabert)
- Hymne en l'honneur d'une Sainte (text by Jean Cras) for female voices with organ (1925, Ed. Salabert)
- Vocalise-Etude, for voice and piano (1928, Ed. Leduc)
- La Flûte de Pan for voice, Pan-pipes, violin, viola and cello (four poems by Lucien Jacques), (1928, Ed. Salabert)
- Soir sur la mer (poem by Virginie Hériot), for voice and piano (1929, Ed. Salabert)
- Trois Noëls (poems by Léon Chancerel), for voices and chorus with piano (1929, Ed. Salabert)
- Trois chansons bretonnes (poems by Jean Cras), for voice and piano (1932, Ed. Salabert)
- Deux chansons: le roi Loudivic, Chanson du barde, extracts from Chevalier étranger by Tanguy Malmanche, for voice and piano (1932, Ed.Salabert)

=== Chamber music ===
- Voyage symbolique (premier trio), for piano, violin & cello (1899, ms.)
- L'Esprit (première sonate), for violin & piano (1900, ms.)
- L'Âme (deuxième sonate), for viola & piano (1900, ms.)
- La Chair (troisième sonate), for cello & piano (1900, Ed. Durand)
- Trio en ut pour piano, violon et violoncelle (1907, Ed. Durand)
- À ma Bretagne, string quartet (1909, Ed. Salabert)
- Quintette, for flute, harp, violin, viola, & cello, or for piano and string quartet (1922, Ed. Salabert)
- Prélude et danse: Demain, saxophone quartet (1924–1926, ms.)
- Deux Impromptus pour harpe (1925, Ed. Salabert)
- Trio pour violon, alto et violoncelle (1926 Spring; 1927, Senart)
- Quatre petites pièces pour violon et piano:
  1. Air varié (1926, Ed. Salabert)
  2. Habanera (1927, Ed. Salabert)
  3. Evocation (1928, Ed.Salabert)
  4. Epilogue (1929, Ed. Salabert)
- Suite en duo, for flute & harp, or for violin & piano (1927, Ed. Salabert)

- Quintette pour harpe, flûte, violon, alto et violoncelle (1928, Ed. Salabert)
- Légende, for cello & piano (reduction of work for cello & orchestra) (1930, Senart)

=== Piano works ===
- Impromptu pastoral (1900, ms.)
- Petite pièce en fa mineur (1901, ms.)
- Valse en mi majeur (1904, ms.)
- Cinq poèmes intimes pour piano: (1912, E. Demets)
  1. En Islande (1902, Ed. Eschig)
  2. Preludio con fughetta (1902, Ed. Eschig)
  3. Au fil de l'eau (1911, Ed. Eschig)
  4. Recueillement (1904, Ed. Eschig)
  5. La maison du matin (1911, Ed. Eschig)
- Deux Paysages: Paysage maritime, Paysage champêtre, piano solo (1917, Ed. Durand)
- Danze (1917, Rouart, Lerolle et cie.)
- Quatre Danze: Danza morbida, Danza scherzosa, Danza tenera, Danza animata, piano solo (1917, Ed. Salabert)
- Âmes d'enfants, pour 6 petites mains, piano six hands (1917, ms.), piano four hands (1922, Senart), also orchestrated (1918, Ed. Salabert)
- Premier anniversaire, «A mon petit Jean-Pierre» (1 May 1919, ms.)
- First string quartet, version for piano, 4 mains, (1921, Rouart, Lerolle et cie.)
- Deux impromptus, for piano or harp, (1926, Senart)

=== Organ ===
- Chorale (1904, ms.)
- Grande marche nuptiale pour orgue (1904, Ed. Schola Cantorum)

=== Orchestral works ===
- Andante religieux (1901, ms.)
- Âmes d'enfants, orchestration of work for «piano et 6 petites mains» (1921, Senart)
- Journal de bord, Suite symphonique (1927, Ed. Salabert)
- Légende pour violoncelle et orchestre (1929, Ed. Salabert)
- Concerto pour piano et orchestre (1931, Ed. Salabert), (reduction for 2 pianos, 1932, Senart)

== Bibliography ==
- Bempéchat, Paul-André. Jean Cras, Polymath of Music and Letters. Farnham (UK): Ashgate, 2009; 610 pp.
- Bempéchat, Paul-André. "Jean Cras", Revised New Grove Dictionary of Music and Musicians. London: MacMillan.
- Bempéchat, Paul-André. "Ravel Writes to Jean Cras", in Liber Amicorum Isabelle Cazeaux: Pendragon Press (Hillsdale, New York: 2005), pp. 365–376.
- Bempéchat, Paul-André. "Fair Winds and Following Seas: Jean Cras' Symphonic Autobiography, 'Journal de bord (1927)'", in Liber Amicorum Isabelle Cazeaux, Pendragon Press (Hillsdale, New York: 2005), pp. 443–457.
- Bempéchat, Paul-André. "The Breton Compositions of Jean Cras", in Proceedings of the 23rd Harvard Celtic Colloquium (2003).
- Bempéchat, Paul-André. "Narrating the Symbol: Jean Cras' Legacy of Song", in Ars Lyrica XII, pp. 3–70. (2002)
- Bempéchat, Paul-André. "Where Formalism Meets Folklore: Jean Cras' 'Trio pour cordes (1925)'", American String Teacher, May 2001, Vol. 51, No. 2, pp. 74–81.
- Bempéchat, Paul-André. "The Choral Works of Jean Cras", The Choral Journal, February 2001, Vol. 41, No. 7, pp. 9–16.
- Bempéchat, Paul-André. "An Admiral of Music: Jean Cras' Chamber Music for Strings", The Strad, London, October 2000, Vol.111, No. 1326, pp. 1096–1100.
- Bempéchat, Paul-André. "Love's Labours Found: Jean Cras' Pieces for Violin and Piano Rediscovered (with apologies to The Bard)", American String Teacher, November 1999, Vol. 49, No. 4, pp. 64–74.
- Bempéchat, Paul-André. "Inside Jean Cras' Musical Laboratory II: Cyclical Composition at its Zenith: 'Quintet for Harp, Flute, and Strings'", American Harp Journal, Summer 1999., Vol. 17, No. 1, pp. 7–12.
- Bempéchat, Paul-André. "Jean Cras and Albert Samain: Parallels and Paradoxes in the Genesis of Polyphème", The Opera Journal, March 1998, Vol. XXXI/1, pp. 3–17.
- Bempéchat, Paul-André. "Inside Jean Cras' Musical Laboratory: An African Diary in Music and Letters: The Genesis of His 'Suite en Duo' for Flute and Harp (1928)'", American Harp Journal, Winter 1998, Vol. 16, No. 4, pp. 7–14.
- Bempéchat, Paul-André. "A Rediscovered Masterpiece: Jean Cras' 'Deux Impromptus pour harpe (1925)'", American Harp Journal, Summer 1998, Vol.16, No. 3, pp. 5–10.
- Bempéchat, Paul-André. Jean Cras, in Die Musik in Geschichte und Gegenwart (MGG), 2001.
- Bempéchat, Paul-André. "Naval Hero—Novel Voice: The Piano Works of Jean Cras", Piano & Keyboard 206, September–October 2000, pp. 47–55.
- Brister, Wanda. "The Vocal Music of Jean Cras", Journal of Singing, March/April 2015, pp. 521–526.
- Cras, M. & Surchamp, Dom Angelico. "Regard sur Jean Cras". Zodiaque, Numéro 123, January 1980.
- Dumesnil, René. Portraits de musiciens français. Paris: 1938. Chapter on Jean Cras.
- Himonet, André. "Jean Cras, musicien de la mer". Revue de la Société Internationale des Amis de la Musique française, December 1932
- Malherbe, Henry. "Jean Cras." Le Temps, 21 September 1932.
- Thomazi, A. Trois marins compositeurs: Roussel, Mariotte, & J. Cras. Paris, Imprimerie Bellemand, 1948.
- Thiollet, Jean-Pierre. Sax, Mule & Co ("Jean Cras", pp. 112–113). Paris, H & D, 2004
