= Navigational instrument =

Tools used by navigators and pilots

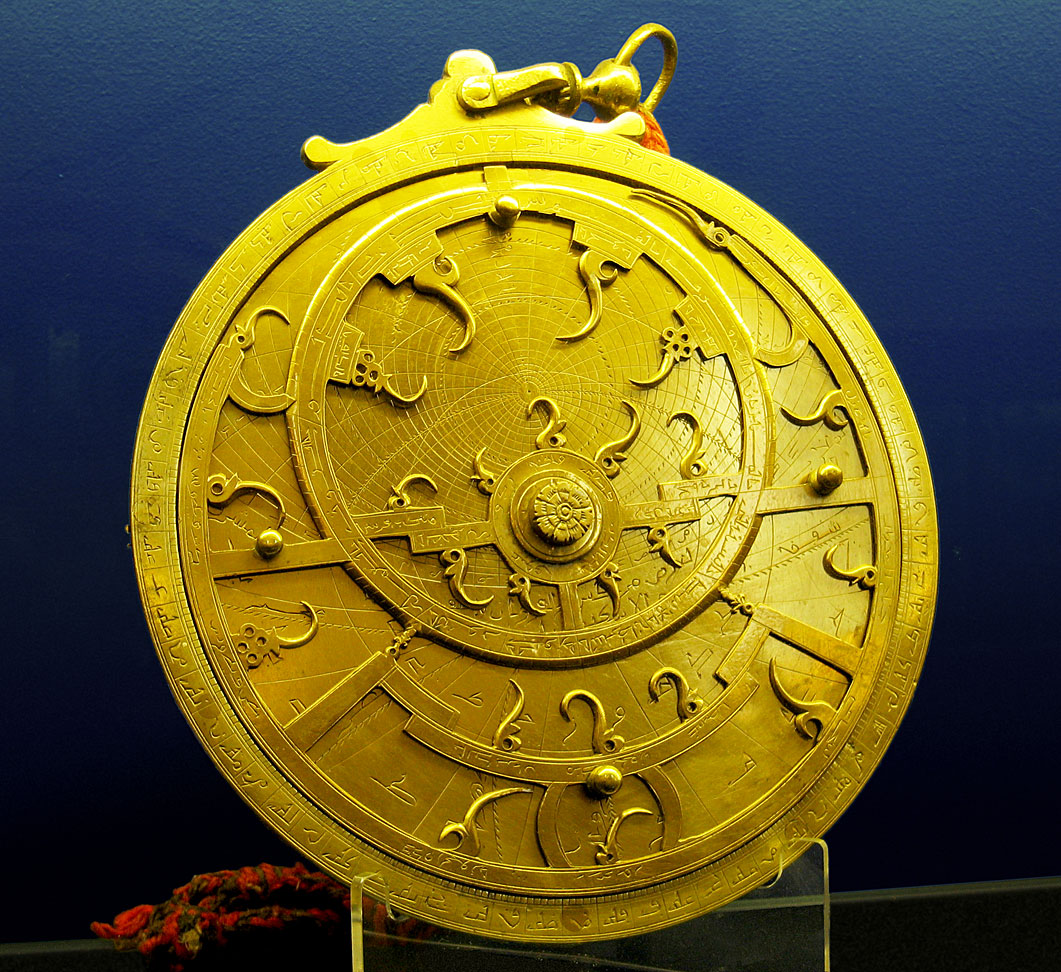
An 18th Century Persian astrolabe – maker unknown. The points of the curved spikes on the front rete plate, mark the positions of the brightest stars. The name of each star being labeled at the base of each spike. The back plate, or mater is engraved with projected coordinate lines. From the Whipple Museum of the History of Science in Cambridge.

Navigational instruments are instruments used by nautical navigators and pilots as tools of their trade. The purpose of navigation is to ascertain the present position and to determine the speed, direction, etc. to arrive at the port or point of destination.

== Charts and drafting instruments ==
- Charts are maps of the areas to be navigated with details specific to the marine environment.
- Computing aids: used in the necessary mathematical calculations. Today electronic computers or calculators are used. Other traditional aids used included tables (trigonometric, logarithms, etc.) and slide rules.
- Dividers used for measuring lengths of lines and approximate lengths of non-linear paths on a chart.
- Nautical almanac used to determine the position in the sky of a celestial body after a sight has been taken.
- Parallel rules used for transferring a line to a parallel position. Also used to compare the orientation of a line to a magnetic or geographic orientation on a compass rose.

== Direct measuring ==
- Chip log and sand glass serve to measure the ship's speed through the water.
- Sounding line used to measure the depth of the water and to pick up samples from the bottom.
- Drift meter optically measures the effects of wind on an aircraft in flight.

== Position finding instruments ==
=== Celestial navigation instruments ===
These instruments are used primarily to measure the elevation or altitude of a celestial object:

- Back staff, the best known of which is the Davis' quadrant. It could measure the altitude of the Sun without having the navigator directly observe the Sun.
- Cross staff, an older instrument long out of use.
- Kamal Very simple instrument used primarily by Arabian navigators. It consists of a small board with a knotted piece of twine through the center. The observer holds one of the knots in his mouth and extends the board away so that the edges make a constant angle with his eyes.
- Mariner's astrolabe Derived from the astrolabe, it was developed in late 15th century and found use in the 16th to 17th centuries. It was replaced by the back staff and later by the octant and sextant.
- Quadrant A very simple instrument which used a plumb bob.

These instruments are also used to measure the angular distance between objects:

- Octant, invented in 1731. The first widely accepted instrument that could measure an angle without being strongly affected by movement.
- Sextant, derived from the octant in 1757, eventually made all previous instruments used for the same purpose obsolete.

=== Bearing instruments ===
- Pelorus used to determine bearings relative to the ship's heading of landmarks, other ships, etc.

=== Compasses ===
- Bearing compass used to determine magnetic bearings of landmarks, other ships or celestial bodies.
- Magnetic compass used to determine the magnetic heading of the ship.

=== Timekeeping ===
- Marine chronometer used to determine time at the prime meridian with great precision which is necessary when reducing sights in celestial navigation.
- Nocturnal used to determine apparent local time by viewing the Polaris and its surrounding stars.
- Ring dial or astronomical ring used to measure the height of a celestial body above the horizon. It could be used to find the altitude of the Sun or determine local time. It let sunlight shine through a small orifice on the rim of the instrument. The point of light striking the far side of the instrument gave the altitude or tell time.

All those mentioned were the traditional instruments used until well into the second half of the 20th century. After World War II electronic aids to navigation developed very rapidly and, to a great extent, replaced more traditional tools. Electronic speed and depth finders have totally replaced their older counterparts. Radar has become widespread even in small boats. Some Electronic aids to navigation like LORAN have already become obsolete themselves and have been replaced by GPS.

=== Electronic Travel Aid ===
As technologies are developed, designers and engineers have also turned their attention to minority groups like people that are visually impaired. In this case, Electronic Travel Aid are developed to target the needs of visual impaired individuals for obstacle identification as well as navigation of the surrounding to enhance mobility. Not only GPS systems, there are other approaches like infrared sensors, ultrasonic sensors as well as optical technologies like cameras that are developed/ developing to enhance the navigation of the minority group.

== See also ==
- Cras plotter
- Breton plotter (aka Portland plotter or Weems protractor)
- Navigation protractor triangle
