= Radar navigation =

Method of marine and air navigation

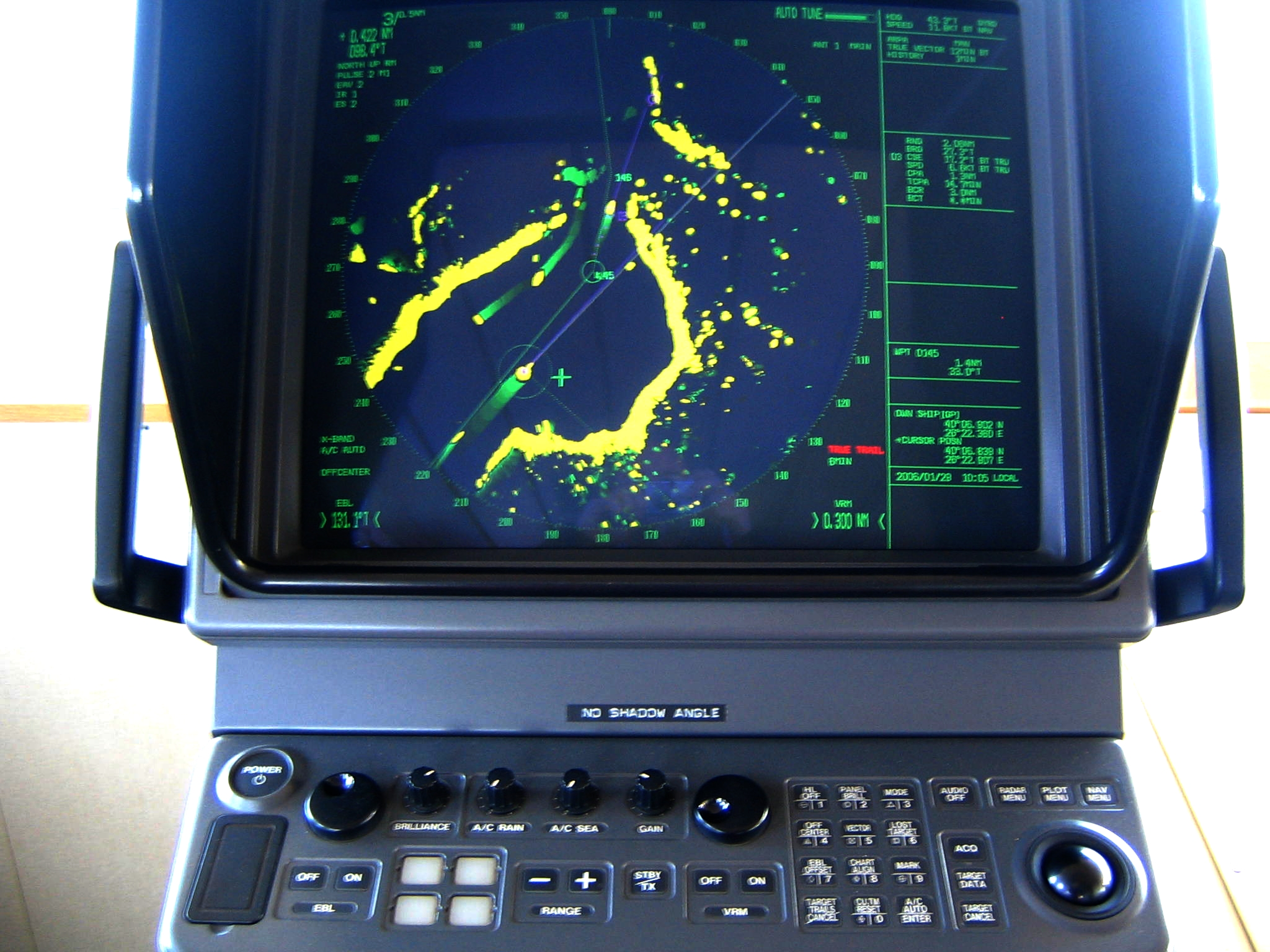
Radar ranges and bearings can be very useful for navigation.

Radar navigation is the utilization of marine and aviation radar systems for vessel and aircraft navigation. When a craft is within radar range of land or special radar aids to navigation, the navigator can take distances and angular bearings to charted objects and use these to establish arcs of position and lines of position on a chart. A fix consisting of only radar information is called a radar fix.

Some types of radar fixes include the relatively self-explanatory methods of "range and bearing to a single object," "two or more bearings," "tangent bearings," and "two or more ranges."

Parallel indexing is a technique defined by William Burger in the 1957 book The Radar Observer's Handbook. This technique involves creating a line on the screen that is parallel to the ship's course, but offset to the left or right by some distance. This parallel line allows the navigator to maintain a given distance away from hazards.

Some techniques have been developed for special situations. One, known as the "contour method," involves marking a transparent plastic template on the radar screen and moving it to the chart to fix a position.

Another special technique, known as the Franklin Continuous Radar Plot Technique, involves drawing the path a radar object should follow on the radar display if the ship stays on its planned course. During the transit, the navigator can check that the ship is on track by checking that the pip lies on the drawn line.

After completing the plotting radar technique, the image from the radar can either be displayed, captured or recorded to a computer monitor using a frame grabber.

== See also ==
- Air navigation
- Celestial navigation
- Dead reckoning
- Doppler radar
- Electronic navigational chart
- Galileo (satellite navigation)
- Geodetic datum
- Great-circle distance
- Marshall Islands stick chart
- Polynesian navigation
- Radio navigation
- Yeoman plotter for transfer of data to paper chart
- Franz Xaver von Zach, a scientific editor and astronomer, first located many places geographically.
