= Dividing engine =

Device for marking graduations on measuring instruments

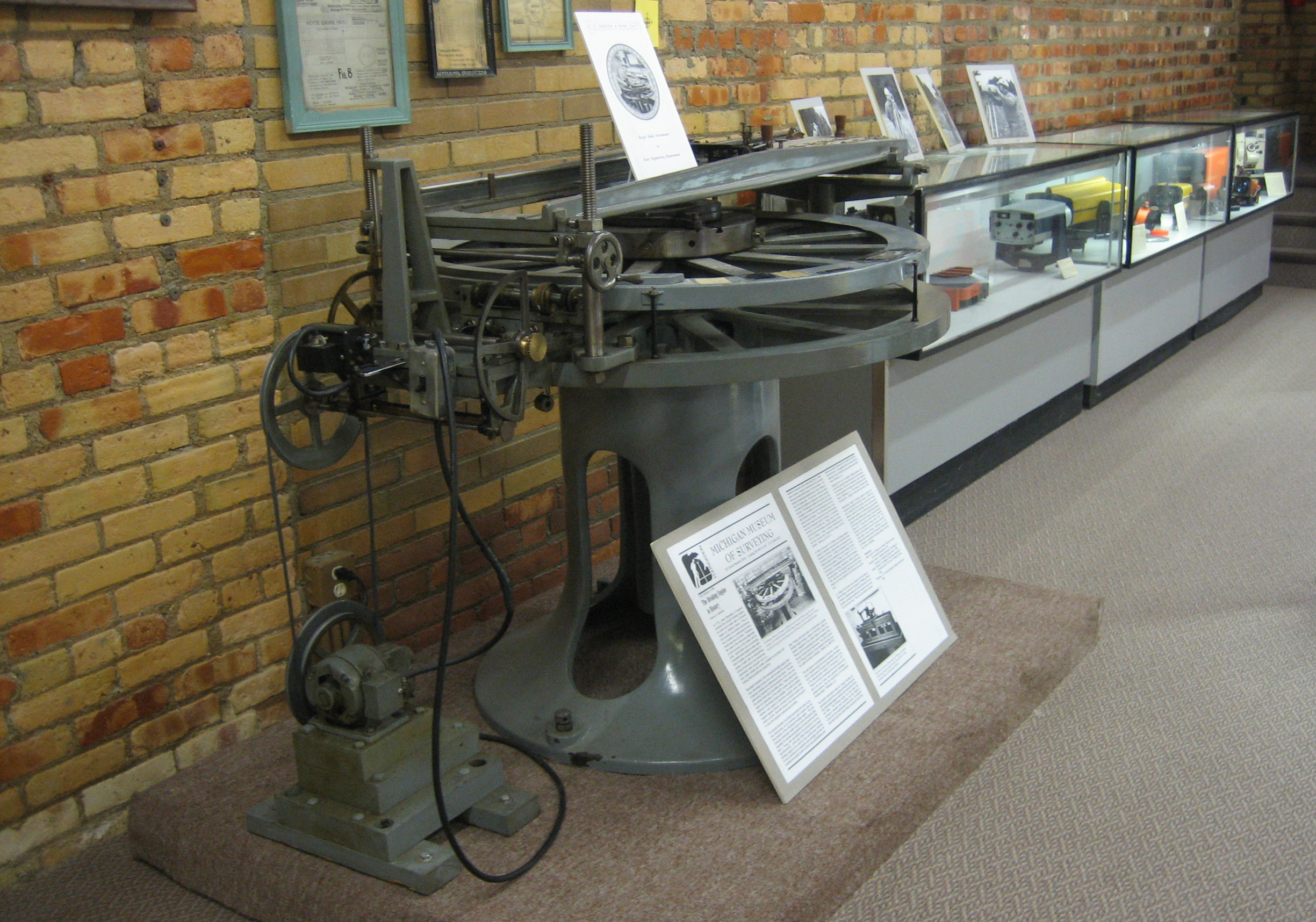
Dividing engine at the Michigan Museum of Surveying

A dividing engine is a device employed to mark graduations on measuring instruments.

== History ==
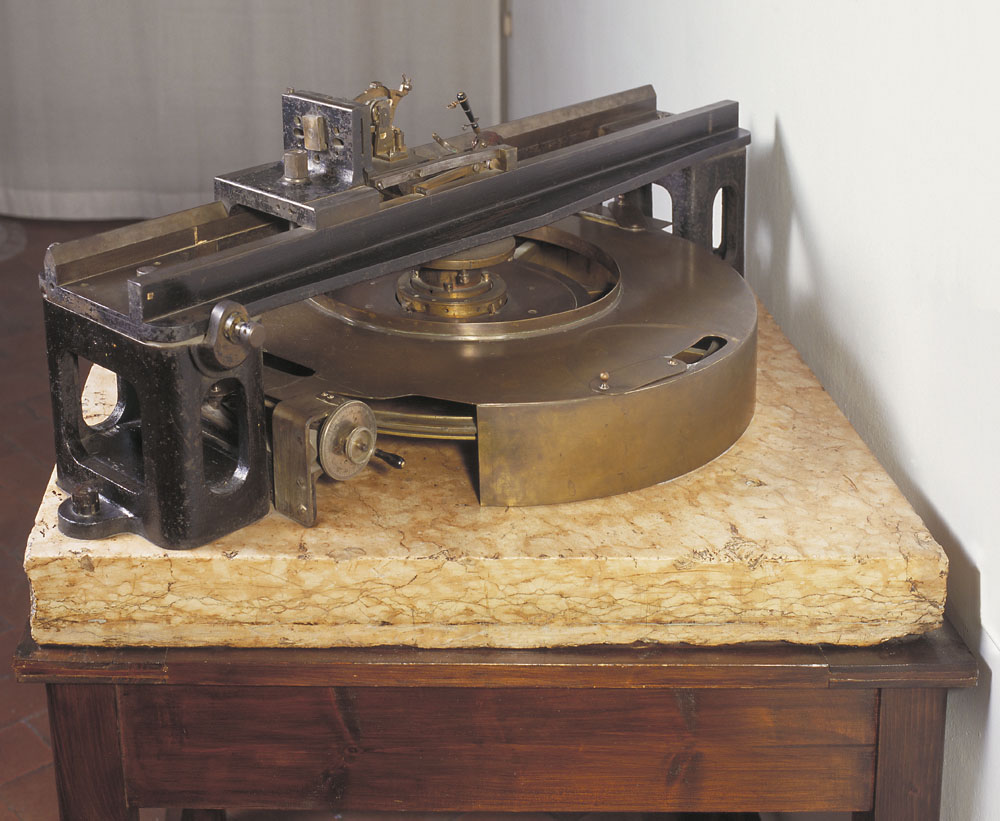
Dividing engine at the Museo Galileo in Florence.

There has always been a need for accurate measuring instruments. Whether it is a linear device such as a ruler or vernier or a circular device such as a protractor, astrolabe, sextant, theodolite, or setting circles for astronomical telescopes, the desire for ever greater precision has always existed. For every improvement in the measuring instruments, such as better alidades or the introduction of telescopic sights, the need for more exact graduations immediately followed.

In early instruments, graduations were typically etched or scribed lines in wood, ivory or brass. Instrument makers devised various devices to perform such tasks. Early Islamic instrument makers must have had techniques for the fine division of their instruments, as this accuracy is reflected in the accuracy of the readings they made. This skill and knowledge seems to have been lost, given that small quadrants and astrolabes in the 15th and 16th centuries did not show fine graduations and were relatively roughly made.

In the 16th century, European instrument makers were hampered by the materials available. Brass was in hammered sheets with rough surfaces and iron graving tools were poor quality. There were not enough makers to have created a long tradition of practice and few were trained by masters.

Transversals set a standard in the early 14th century. Tycho Brahe used transversals on his instruments and made the method better known. Transversals based on straight lines do not provide correct subdivisions on an arc, so other methods, such as those based on the use of circular arcs as developed by Philippe de La Hire, were also used.

Another system was created in the 16th century by Pedro Nunes and was called nonius after him. It consisted of tracing a certain number of concentric circles on an instrument and dividing each successive one with one fewer divisions than the adjacent outer circle. Thus the outermost quadrant would have 90° in 90 equal divisions, the next inner would have 89 divisions, the next 88 and so on. When an angle was measured, the circle and the division on which the alidade fell was noted. A table was then consulted to provide the exact measure. However, this system was difficult to construct and used by few. Tycho Brahe was one exception.

Some improvements to Nunes' system were developed by Christopher Clavius and Jacob Curtius. Curtius' work led directly to that of Pierre Vernier, published in 1631. Vernier refined this process and gave us the vernier scale. However, though these various techniques improved the reading of graduations, they did not contribute directly to the accuracy of their construction. Further improvements came slowly, and a new development was required: the dividing engine.

Prior work on the development of gear cutting machines had prepared the way. Such devices were required to cut a circular plate with uniform gear teeth. Clockmakers were familiar with these methods and they were important in developing dividing engines. George Graham devised a process of using geometric methods to divide the limb of an instrument. He developed a sophisticated beam compass to aid marking of the graduations. John Bird and Jeremiah Sisson followed on with these techniques. These beam compass techniques were used into the 19th century, as the dividing engines that followed did not scale up to the largest instruments being constructed.

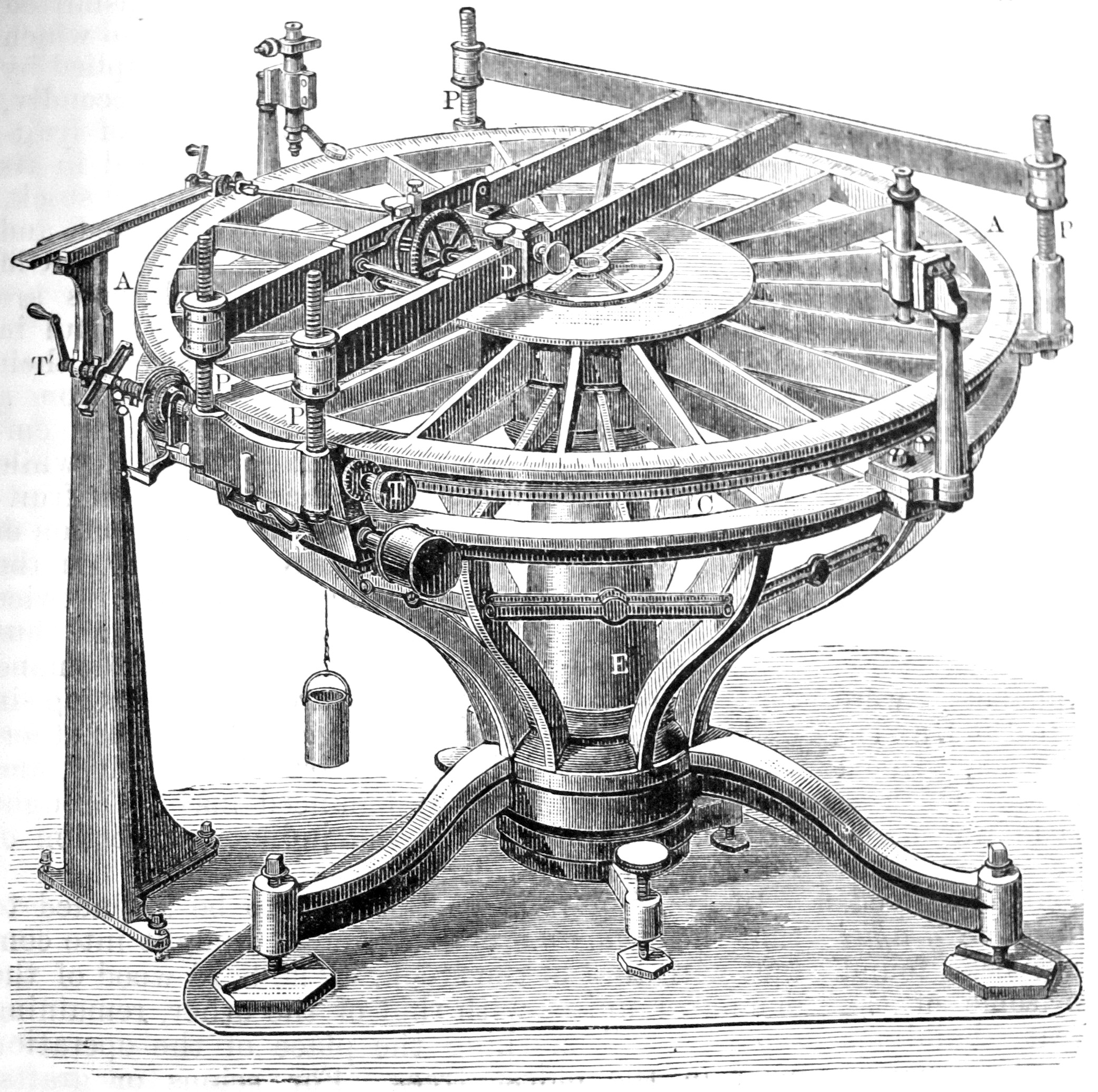
Circular Dividing Engine

The first true circular dividing engine was probably constructed by Henry Hindley, a clockmaker, around 1739. This was reported to the Royal Society by John Smeaton in 1785. It was based directly on a gear cutting machine for clockworks. It used a toothed index plate and a worm gear to advance the mechanism. Duc de Chaulnes created two dividing engines between 1765 and 1768 for dividing circular arcs and linear scales. He desired to improve on the graduation of instruments by removing the skill of the maker from the technique where possible. While beam compass use was critically dependent on the skill of the user, his machine produced more regular divisions by virtue of its design. His machines were also inspired by the prior work of the clockmakers.

Jesse Ramsden followed duc de Chaulnes by five years in the production of his dividing engine. As with the prior inventions, Ramsden's used a tangent screw mechanism to advance the machine from one position to another. However, he had developed a screw-cutting lathe that was particularly advanced and produced a superior product. This engine was developed with funding from the Board of Longitude on condition that it be described in detail (along with the related screw-cutting lathe) and not be protected by patent. This allowed others to freely copy the device and improve on it. In fact, the Board required that he teach others to construct their own copies and make his dividing engine available to graduate instruments made by others.

== Refinements ==
Edward Troughton was the first to build a copy of the Ramsden design. He enhanced the design and produced his own version. This permitted an improvement in the accuracy of the dividing engine.

Samuel Rhee developed his own endless screw cutting machine and was able to sell machines to others. His screws were considered the finest available at the time.

In France, Étienne Lenoir created a dividing engine of greater accuracy than the English version. Mégnié, Richer, Fortin and Jecker had also built dividing engines of considerable quality.

By the beginning of the 19th century, it was possible to make instruments such as the sextant that remained fully serviceable and of sufficient accuracy to be in use for a half century or more.

The dividing engine was unique among developments in the manufacture of scientific instruments, as it was immediately accepted by all makers. There was no uncertainty in the value of this development.

Bryan Donkin designed and built a screw cutting and dividing engine lathe in 1826, which set new standards of precision for the creation of accurate leadscrews, a necessary precursor to the development of precision machining in the Industrial Revolution.

== See also ==
- Henry Joseph Grayson - an Australian inventor who developed an engine (~1900) for making diffraction gratings that ruled 120,000 lines to the inch (approximately 4,700 per mm).
