= Plane table =

Device used in surveying

A plane table (plain table prior to 1830) is a device used in surveying, site mapping, exploration mapping, coastal navigation mapping, and related disciplines to provide a solid and level surface on which to make field drawings, charts and maps. The early use of the name plain table reflected its simplicity and plainness rather than its flatness. "Plane" refers to the table being both flat and levelled (horizontal).

== History ==
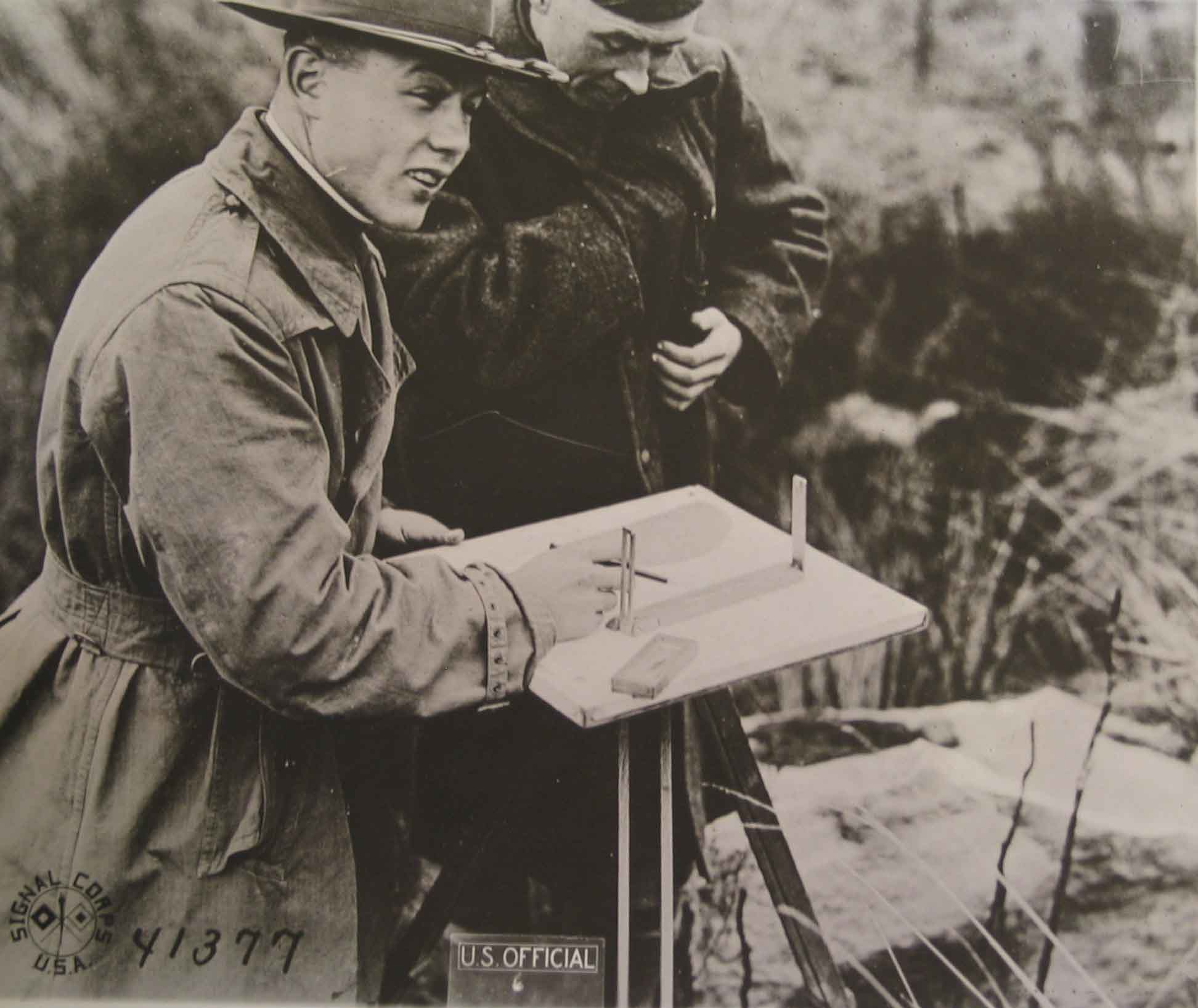
Using a plane table

The earliest mention of a plane table dates to 1551 in Abel Foullon's "Usage et description de l'holomètre", published in Paris. However, since Foullon's description was of a complete, fully developed instrument, it must have been invented earlier.

A brief description was also added to the 1591 edition of Digge's Pantometria. The first mention of the device in English was by Cyprian Lucar in 1590.

The Swiss instrument maker Leonhard Zubler published an account of the plane table in Novum instrumentum geometricum, 1607. He used the term Instrumentum Chorographicum crediting its invention to Philipp Eberhard, a fellow Swiss instrument maker based in Zurich.

Some have credited Johann Richter, also known as Johannes Praetorius, a Nuremberg mathematician, in 1610 with the first plane table, but this appears to be incorrect.

The plane table became a popular instrument for surveying. Its use was widely taught. Some considered it a substandard instrument compared to other devices such as the theodolite, since it was relatively easy to use. By allowing the use of graphical methods rather than mathematical calculations, it could be used by those with less education than other instruments. The addition of a camera to the plane table, as was done from 1890 by Sebastian Finsterwalder in conjunction with a phototheodolite, established photogrammetry in spatial and temporal surveying.

== Construction ==
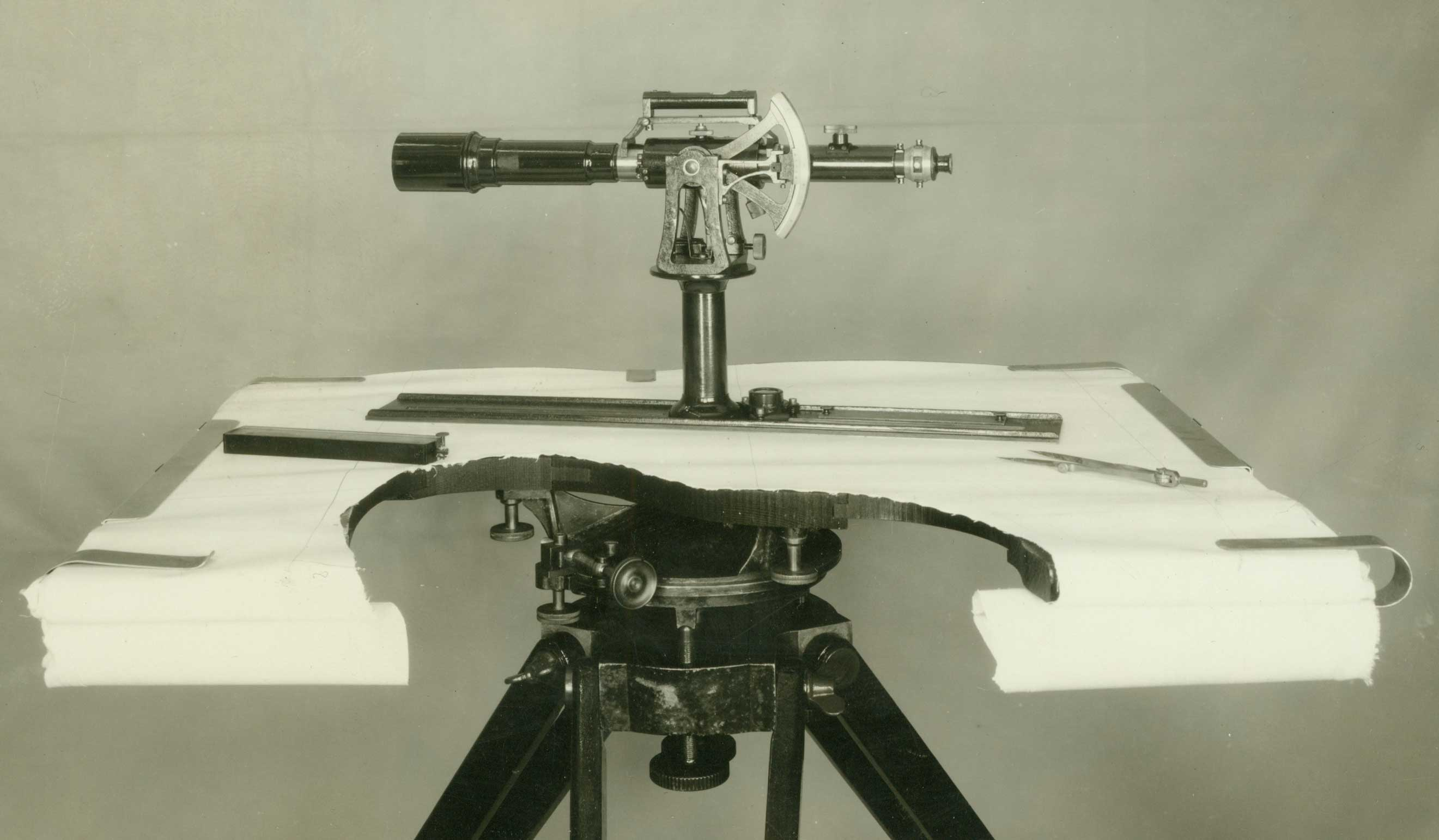
A plane table with part of the surface cut away to show the mounting on the tripod. The mount allows the table to be levelled. On the table, the alidade with telescopic sight is seen.

A plane table consists of a smooth table surface mounted on a sturdy base. The connection between the table top and the base permits one to level the table precisely, using bubble levels, in a horizontal plane. The base, a tripod, is designed to support the table over a specific point on land. By adjusting the length of the legs, one can bring the table level regardless of the roughness of the terrain.

== Usage ==
In use, a plane table is set over a point and brought to precise horizontal level. A drawing sheet is attached to the surface and an alidade is used to sight objects of interest. The alidade, in modern examples of the instrument a rule with a telescopic sight, can then be used to construct a line on the drawing that is in the direction of the object of interest.

By using the alidade as a surveying level, information on the topography of the site can be directly recorded on the drawing as elevations. Distances to the objects can be measured directly or by the use of stadia marks in the telescope of the alidade.
