= Lucar (surname) =

Lucar or Lúcar is a surname, and may refer to:

- Cyprian Lucar (1544–1611), English mechanician and author
- Elizabeth Lucar (1510–1537), English calligrapher
- Jorge Lucar (born 1934), Chilean Army general
- Nicolás Lúcar (fl. 1980s–?), Peruvian journalist

== See also ==
- Lucar, automobile marque
- Lúcar, Spain
