= Nonius (device) =

Measuring tool used in navigation and astronomy

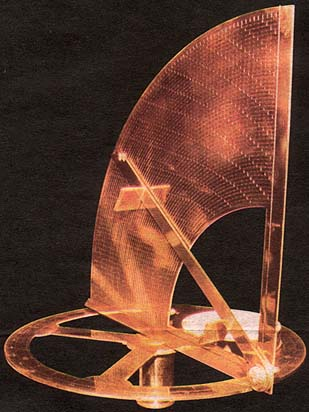
Pedro Nunes Nonius model

Nonius is a measuring tool used in navigation and astronomy named in honour of its inventor, Pedro Nunes (Latin: Petrus Nonius), a Portuguese author, mathematician and navigator. The nonius was created in 1542 as a system for taking finer measurements on circular instruments such as the astrolabe. The system was eventually adapted into the Vernier scale in 1631 by the French mathematician Pierre Vernier.

== Technical features ==
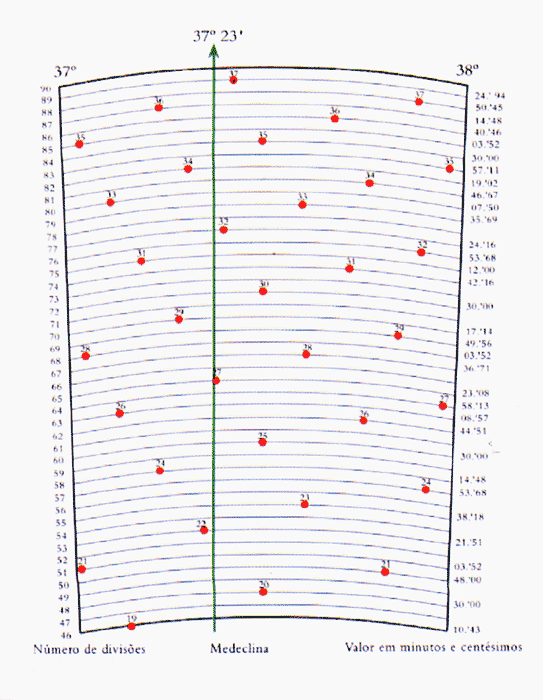
Nonius method of measuring an angle with higher precision

The nonius was used to improve the astrolabe's accuracy. This consisted of a number of concentric circles traced on an instrument and dividing each successive one with one fewer divisions than the adjacent outer circle. On a standard scale of 90 degrees, there are an additional 44–45 concentric circles, with each divided into a specific unit size such that a scale unit on position $n$ had an arc of $90/n$ degrees. Thus, the outermost quadrant would comprise 90° in 90 equal divisions, the next inner would have 89 divisions, the next 88 and so on. When an angle was measured, the circle and the division on which the alidade fell was noted. A table was then consulted to provide the exact measure.

== Applications ==
The astronomer Tycho Brahe applied the nonius to the astronomic quadrant.

In numerically controlled machines, the nonius is part of several absolute encoders, that measure linear or rotational displacements.

== See also ==
- Transversal (instrument making)
