= Vernier scale =

Auxiliary scale of a measurement device, used to increase precision

Vernier caliper scales; main at top, vernier at bottom. It reads 3.58 ± 0.02 mm by adding 3.00 mm (left red mark) on the fixed main scale to vernier 0.58 mm (right red mark). The main scale reading is that to the left of the zero on the vernier scale. The vernier reading is found by locating the best aligned lines between the two scales. The 0.02 mm engraving indicates the caliper's readability and is the "vernier constant" for this scale.

A vernier scale (/ˈvɜːrniːər/ VUR-nee-ər), named after Pierre Vernier, is a visual aid to take an accurate measurement reading between two graduation markings on a linear scale by using mechanical interpolation, which increases resolution and reduces measurement uncertainty by using vernier acuity. It may be found on many types of instrument measuring length or measuring angles, but in particular on a vernier caliper, which measures lengths of human-scale objects (including internal and external diameters).

The vernier is a subsidiary scale replacing a single measured-value pointer, and has for instance ten divisions equal in distance to nine divisions on the main scale. The interpolated reading is obtained by observing which of the vernier scale graduations is coincident with a graduation on the main scale, which is easier to perceive than visual estimation between two points. Such an arrangement can go to a higher resolution by using a higher scale ratio, known as the vernier constant. A vernier may be used on circular or straight scales where a simple linear mechanism is adequate. Examples are calipers and micrometers to measure to fine tolerances, on sextants for navigation, on theodolites in surveying, and generally on scientific instruments. The Vernier principle of interpolation is also used for electronic displacement sensors such as absolute encoders to measure linear or rotational movement, as part of an electronic measuring system.

== History ==
The first caliper with a secondary scale, which contributed extra precision, was invented in 1631 by the French mathematician Pierre Vernier (1580–1637). Its use was described in detail in English in Navigatio Britannica (1750) by mathematician and historian John Barrow. While calipers are the most typical use of vernier scales today, they were originally developed for angle-measuring instruments such as astronomical quadrants.

In some languages, the vernier scale is called a 'nonius' after Portuguese mathematician and cosmographer Pedro Nunes (Latin - Petrus Nonius, 1502–1578). In English, this term was used until the end of the 18th century. Nonius now refers to an earlier instrument that Nunes developed.

The name "vernier" was popularised by the French astronomer Jérôme Lalande (1732–1807) through his 'Traité d'astronomie' (2 vols) (1764).

== Functioning ==
Vernier caliper with a vernier constant of 0.1 for clarity of operation. The standard for a caliper is usually a constant of 0.02

Vernier caliper scale with the normal 0.02 vernier constant, showing measurement of object at 19.44 mm to two decimal places

The use of the vernier scale is shown on a vernier caliper which measures the internal and the external diameters of an object.

The vernier scale is constructed so that it is spaced at a constant fraction of the fixed main scale. So for a vernier with a constant of 0.1, each mark on the vernier is spaced 9/10 of those on the main scale. If you put the two scales together with zero points aligned, the first mark on the vernier scale is 1/10 short of the first main scale mark, the second is 2/10 short, and so on up to the ninth mark, which is misaligned by 9/10. Only when a full ten marks are counted, is there alignment, because the tenth mark is 10/10—a whole main scale unit—short, and therefore aligns with the ninth mark on the main scale. (In simple words, each VSD = 0.9 MSD, so each decrement of length 0.1 adds 10 times to make one main-scale division only in 9 divisions of vernier-scale division).

Now if you move the vernier by a small amount, say, 1/10 of its fixed main scale, the only pair of marks that come into alignment are the first pair, since these were the only ones originally misaligned by 1/10. If we move it 2/10, the second pair aligns, since these are the only ones originally misaligned by that amount. If we move it 5/10, the fifth pair aligns—and so on. For any movement, only one pair of marks aligns and that pair shows the value between the marks on the fixed scale.

=== Least count or vernier constant ===
The difference between the value of one main scale division and the value of one vernier scale division is known as the least count of the vernier, also known as the vernier constant. Let the measure of the smallest main-scale reading, that is the distance between two consecutive graduations (also called its pitch) be S, and the distance between two consecutive vernier scale graduations be V, such that the length of (n − 1) main-scale divisions is equal to n vernier-scale divisions. Then

the length of (n − 1) main-scale divisions = the length of n vernier-scale division, or
(n − 1)S = nV, or
nS − S = nV. Least count (S-V) = S/n

=== Vernier acuity ===
Vernier scales work so well because most people are especially good at detecting which of the lines is aligned and misaligned, and that ability gets better with practice, in fact far exceeding the optical capability of the eye. This ability to detect alignment is called vernier acuity. Historically, none of the alternative technologies exploited this or any other hyperacuity, giving the vernier scale an advantage over its competitors.

=== Zero error ===
Zero error is defined as the condition where a measuring instrument registers a nonzero value at the zero position. In case of vernier calipers it occurs when a zero on main scale does not coincide with a zero on vernier scale. The zero error may be of two types: when the scale is towards numbers greater than zero, it is positive; otherwise it is negative. The method to use a vernier scale or caliper with zero error is to use the formula

actual reading = main scale + vernier scale − (zero error).

Zero error may arise due to knocks or other damage which causes the 0.00 mm marks to be misaligned when the jaws are perfectly closed or just touching each other.

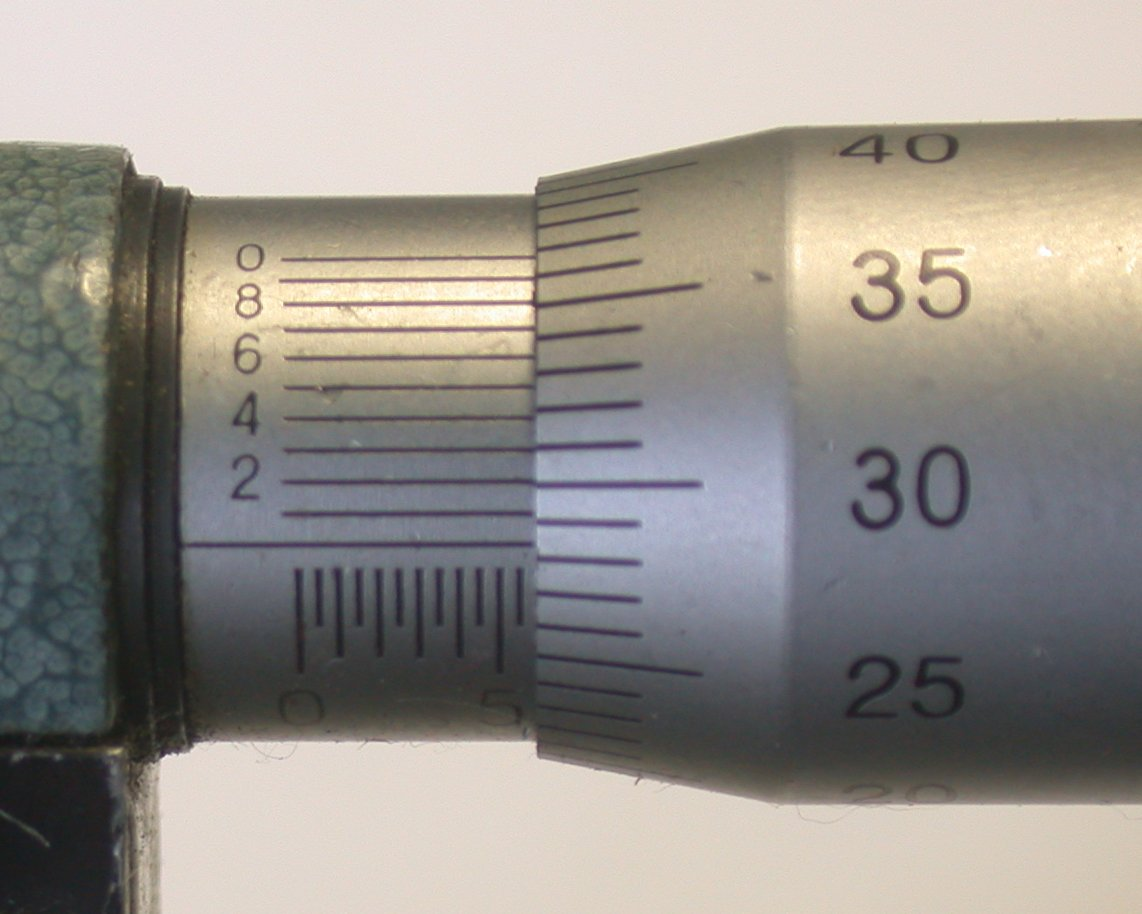
Vernier micrometer reading 5.783 ± 0.001 mm, comprising 5.5 mm on main screw lead scale, 0.28 mm on screw rotation scale, and 0.003 mm added from vernier.

When the jaws are closed and if the reading is 0.10 mm, the zero error is referred to as +0.10 mm. The method to use a vernier scale or caliper with zero error is to use the formula 'actual reading = main scale + vernier scale − (zero error)' thus the actual reading is 19.00 + 0.54 − (0.10) = 19.44

Positive zero error refers to the case when the jaws of the vernier caliper are just closed and the reading is a positive reading away from the actual reading of 0.00 mm. If the reading is 0.10 mm, the zero error is referred to as +0.10 mm.

Negative zero error refers to the case when the jaws of the vernier caliper are just closed and the reading is a negative reading away from the actual reading of 0.00 mm. If the reading is 0.08 mm, the zero error is referred to as −0.08 mm.

If positive, the error is subtracted from the mean reading the instrument reads. Thus if the instrument reads 4.39 cm and the error is +0.05, the actual length will be 4.39 − 0.05 = 4.34. If negative, the error is added to the mean reading the instrument reads. Thus if the instrument reads 4.39 cm and as above the error is −0.05 cm, the actual length will be 4.39 + 0.05 = 4.44. (Considering that, the quantity is called zero correction which should always be added algebraically to the observed reading to the correct value.)

Zero error (ZE) = ±n × least count (LC)

=== Direct and retrograde verniers ===
Direct verniers are the most common. The indicating scale is constructed so that when its zero point coincides with the start of the data scale, its graduations are at a slightly smaller spacing than those on the data scale and so none but the last graduation coincide with any graduations on the data scale. N graduations of the indicating scale cover N − 1 graduations of the data scale.

Retrograde verniers are found on some devices, including surveying instruments. A retrograde vernier is similar to the direct vernier, except its graduations are at a slightly larger spacing than on the main scale. N graduations of the indicating scale cover N + 1 graduations of the data scale. The retrograde vernier also extends backwards along the data scale.

Direct and retrograde verniers are read in the same manner.

== Recent uses ==
This section includes references to techniques which use the Vernier principle to make fine-resolution measurements.

Vernier spectroscopy is a type of cavity-enhanced laser absorption spectroscopy that is especially sensitive to trace gases. The method uses a frequency-comb laser combined with a high-finesse optical cavity to produce an absorption spectrum in a highly parallel manner. The method is also capable of detecting trace gases in very low concentration due to the enhancement effect of the optical resonator on the effective optical path length.

== See also ==
- Micrometer
- Nonius – device invented by Pedro Nunes
- Pierre Vernier
- Slide rule – graphical analog calculator
- Transversal (instrument making) – technique in use prior to vernier scales
