= Henry Hindley =

- Born: 1701; Wigan
- Died: 1771; York
- Occupation: clockmaker

Henry Hindley (1701 – 1771) was an English clockmaker, watchmaker and maker of scientific instruments. He invented a screw-cutting lathe, a fusee-cutting engine and an improved wheel-cutting engine and made one of the first dividing engines, for the construction of accurately-graduated arcs on scientific instruments. He is thought to have made the world's first equatorially-mounted telescope, which can now be seen in Burton Constable Hall in East Yorkshire.

Hindley was a Roman Catholic, born in Wigan (Lancs) in 1701. He was apprenticed and made clocks in Wigan from 1726 to 1730 and moved to York in 1731, where he was established first in Petergate and then Stonegate from 1741 until his death in 1771. John Smeaton's cousin John Holmes was apprenticed to Hindley. He was succeeded by his son, who died in 1775.

Most of his surviving clocks are high quality long-case clocks featuring long going and the use of deadbeat escapements, six spoke wheels, high count trains and repeating, enclosed movements. A year-going clock with a bolt-and-shutter maintaining power is in the York Castle Museum, together with four eight-day clocks. A further example, a Hindley movement of around 1740 fitted into a walnut marquetry case of ca. 1690, is at the stately home of Temple Newsam near Leeds. Others exist in private collections.

He made turret clocks such as those for York Minster (much modified over the years) and the Bar Convent in York. One of his bracket clocks may also be seen in York Minster. He made watches in some numbers: examples exist in the Science Museum and the Victoria and Albert Museum, as well as the York Castle Museum.

== See also ==
- List of astronomical instrument makers
