= Leonhard Zubler =

Leonhard Zubler (November 20, 1565 Zurich – August 26, 1611, Zurich (?) was a Swiss scientific instrument maker. He played a significant role as a mathematical practitioner developing Swiss cartography and the application of mathematics to a military use, particularly for artillery.

== Published works ==
- Novum instrumentum geometricum, 1607 Basel: Lodovici Regis
