= Pedro Nunes =

Portuguese mathematician (1502–1578)

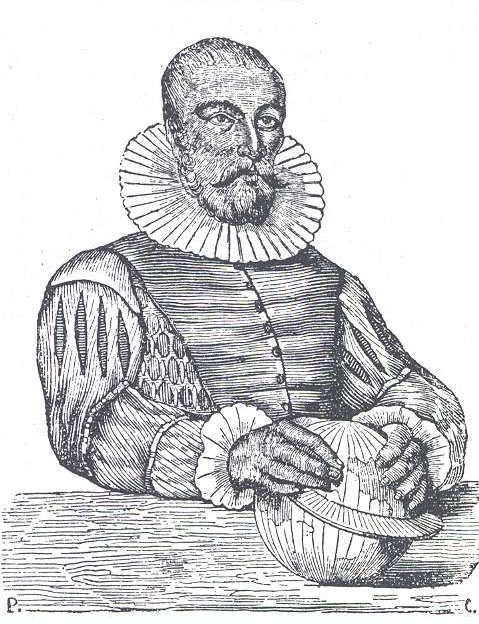
- Pedro Nunes, 1843 print
- Born: 1502; Alcácer do Sal, Portugal
- Died: 11 August 1578 (aged 76); Coimbra, Portugal
- Occupations: Mathematician, cosmographer, and professor

Pedro Nunes (Portuguese: [ˈpeðɾu ˈnunɨʃ]; Latin: Petrus Nonius; 1502 – 11 August 1578) was a Portuguese mathematician, cosmographer, and professor, probably from a New Christian (of Jewish origin) family.

Considered one of the greatest mathematicians of his time, Nunes is best known for being the first to approach navigation and cartography with mathematical tools. Among other accomplishments, he was the first to propose the idea of a loxodrome (a rhumb line), and was the inventor of several measuring devices, including the nonius (from which the Vernier scale was derived), named after his Latin surname.

== Life ==
Little is known about Nunes' early education, life or family background, only that he was born in Alcácer do Sal in Portugal, his origins are possibly Jewish and that his grandchildren spent a few years behind bars after they were accused by the Portuguese Inquisition of professing and secretly practicing Judaism. He studied at the University of Salamanca, maybe from 1517 until 1522. He returned to Lisbon c. 1529 and started teaching at the university.

He continued his medical studies but held various teaching posts within the University of Lisbon, including Moral, Philosophy, Logic and Metaphysics. He obtained his doctorate in medicine in 1532. When, in 1537, the Portuguese University located in Lisbon returned to Coimbra, he moved to the re-founded University of Coimbra to teach mathematics, a post he held until 1562. This was a new post in the University of Coimbra and it may have been established to provide instruction in the technical requirements for navigation: clearly a topic of great importance in Portugal at this period, when the control of sea trade was the primary source of Portuguese wealth. Mathematics became an independent post in 1544.

In addition to teaching he was appointed Royal Cosmographer in 1529 and Chief Royal Cosmographer in 1547: a post which he held until his death.

In 1531, King John III of Portugal charged Nunes with the education of his younger brothers Luís and Henry. Years later Nunes was also charged with the education of the king's grandson, and future king, Sebastian.

It is possible that, while at the University of Coimbra, future astronomer Christopher Clavius attended Pedro Nunes' classes, and was influenced by his works. Clavius, proponent of the Gregorian Calendar, the greatest figure of the Collegio Romano, the great center of Roman Catholic knowledge of that period, classified Nunes as “supreme mathematical genius". Nunes died in Coimbra.

== Work ==
Pedro Nunes lived in a transition period, during which science was changing from valuing theoretical knowledge (which defined the main role of a scientist/mathematician as commenting on previous authors), to providing experimental data, both as a source of information and as a method of confirming theories. Nunes was, above all, one of the last great commentators, as is shown by his first published work “Tratado da Esfera”, enriched with comments and additions that denote a profound knowledge of the difficult cosmography of the period. He also acknowledged the value of experimentation.

In his Tratado da sphera he argued for a common and universal diffusion of knowledge. Accordingly, he not only published works in Latin, at that time science's lingua franca, aiming for an audience of European scholars, but also in Portuguese, and Spanish (Livro de Algebra).

=== Navigation ===
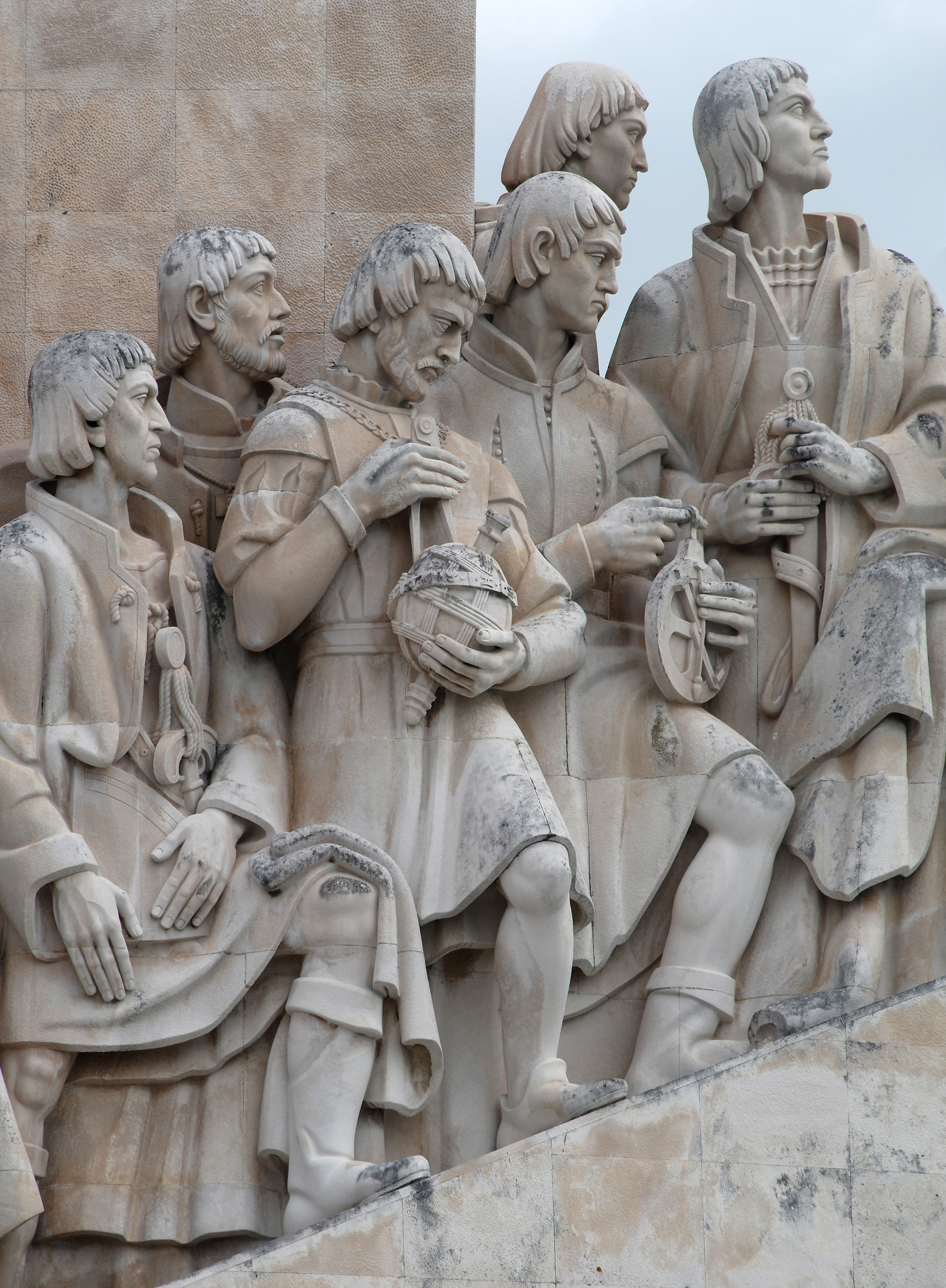
Detail of the Monument to the Portuguese Discoveries showing the well-known navigators. Left to right: Jácome de Maiorca (cosmographer and chart maker), Pedro Escobar (navigator), Pedro Nunes (shown holding an armillary sphere), Pero de Alenquer (navigator), Gil Eanes (navigator) and finally João Gonçalves Zarco (navigator)

Much of Nunes' work related to navigation. He was the first to understand why a ship maintaining a steady course would not travel along a great circle, the shortest path between two points on Earth, but would instead follow a spiral course, called a loxodrome. These lines —also called rhumb lines— maintain a fixed angle with the meridians. In other words, loxodromic curves are directly related to the construction of the Nunes connection —also called navigator connection.

In his Treaty defending the sea chart, Nunes argued that a nautical chart should have its parallels and meridians shown as straight lines. Yet he was unsure how to solve the problems that this caused: a situation that lasted until Mercator developed the projection bearing his name. The Mercator Projection is the system which is still used.

=== Geometry ===
Nunes also solved the problem of finding the day with the shortest twilight duration, for any given position, and its duration. This problem per se is not greatly important, yet it shows the geometric genius of Nunes as it was a problem which was independently tackled by Johann and Jakob Bernoulli more than a century later with less success. They could find a solution to the problem of the shortest day, but failed to determine its duration, possibly because they got lost in the details of differential calculus which, at that time, had only recently been developed. The achievement also shows that Nunes was a pioneer in solving maxima and minima problems, which became a common requirement only in the next century using differential calculus.

=== Cosmology ===
He was probably the last major mathematician to make relevant improvements to the ptolemaic system (a geocentric model describing the relative motion of the Earth and Sun). With time, in a slow and complex process, the geocentric model was replaced by the heliocentric system proposed by Nicolaus Copernicus. Nunes knew Copernicus' work but referred only briefly to it in his published works, with the purpose of correcting some mathematical errors.

Most of Nunes' achievements were possible because of his profound understanding of spherical trigonometry and his ability to transpose Ptolemy's adaptations of Euclidean geometry to it.

=== Inventions ===
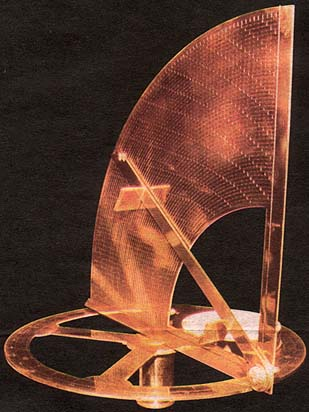
Modern reconstruction of a quadrant with nonius

Nunes worked on several practical nautical problems concerning course correction as well as attempting to develop more accurate devices to determine a ship's position.

He created the nonius to improve the accuracy of instruments (such as the quadrant). This device consisted of a number of concentric circles traced on the instrument, with each successive circle divided into one fewer division than the adjacent outer circle.Thus, the outermost quadrant would comprise 90° divided into 90 equal parts; the next inner quadrant would have 89 divisions, the next 88, and so on. When an angle was measured, the circle and the division on which the alidade fell was noted. A table was then consulted to provide the exact measure.

The nonius was used by Tycho Brahe, who considered it too complex. The method inspired improved systems by Christopher Clavius and Jacob Curtius. These were eventually improved further by Pierre Vernier in 1631, which reduced the nonius to the Vernier scale that includes two scales, one of them fixed and the other movable. Vernier himself used to say that his invention was a perfected nonius and for a long time it was known as the “nonius”, even in France. In some languages, the Vernier scale is still named after Nunes, for example nonieskala in Swedish.

Pedro Nunes also worked on some mechanics problems, from a mathematical point of view.

== Influence ==
Nunes was very influential internationally, e.g. on the work of John Dee and Edward Wright.

== Honours ==
- One of the best known Lisbon public Secondary/High Schools is named after Pedro Nunes, Escola Secundária de Pedro Nunes (teaching 7th to 12th grade). It was founded, in 1906, as Lyceu Central da 3ª Zona Escolar de Lisboa (Central Liceum of the 3rd School Area of Lisbon). Over the years had known several designations: Lyceu Central de Pedro Nunes (1911–1930), Liceu Normal de Lisboa (1930–1937), Liceu Pedro Nunes (1937–1956), Liceu Normal de Pedro Nunes (1956–1978) and Escola Secundária de Pedro Nunes (1978–present), but is still known as Liceu Pedro Nunes. Multiple Portuguese personalities have studied in Pedro Nunes. The current headquarters commemorated its centenary in 2011, after being refurbished and modernized between 2008 and 2010.
- He was featured on 100 escudos coins.
- The Instituto Pedro Nunes in Coimbra, a business incubator and a center of innovation and technology transfer founded by the University of Coimbra, is named after Pedro Nunes.
- Asteroid 5313 Nunes is named after him
- TAP Air Portugal has named an Airbus A330-202 airplane after him, registered CS-TOP.
- Since 2023, the Europlanet Society Iberia has annually awarded the "Pedro Nunes" award to the best Iberian Master's Dissertation in Planetary Science and Exploration.

== Works ==
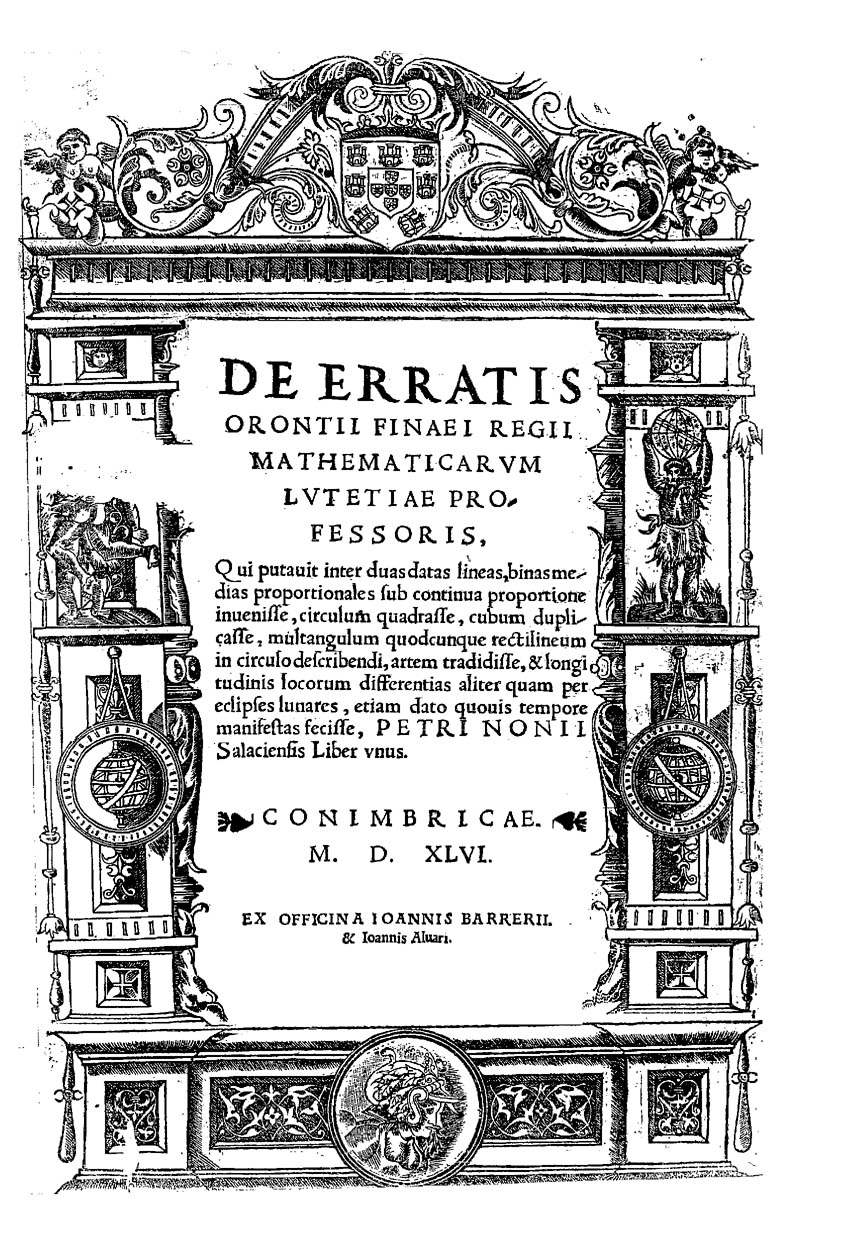
De erratis Orontii Finæi, 1546

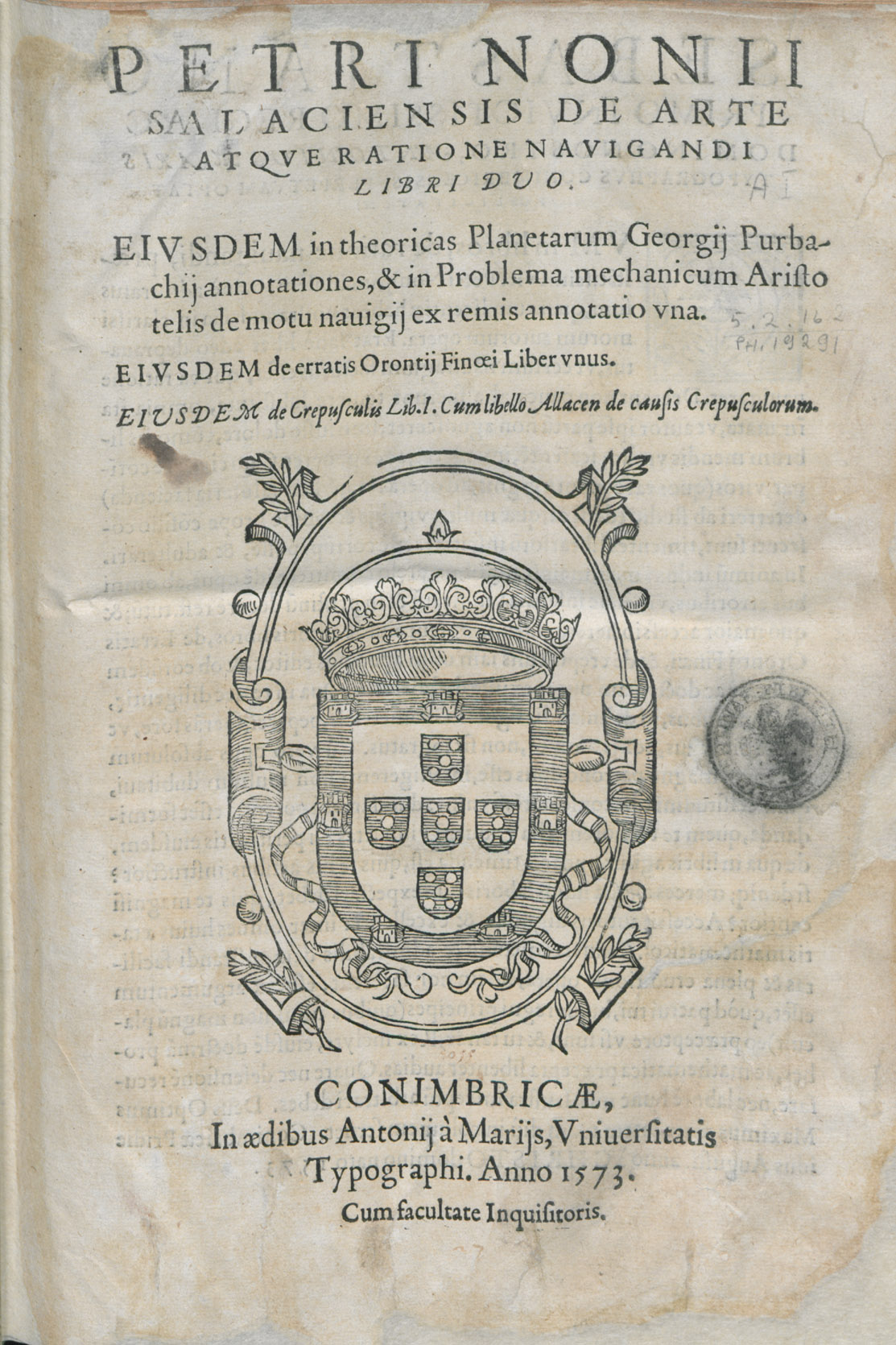
De arte atque ratione navigandi, 1573

Pedro Nunes translated, commented and expanded some of the major works in his field, and he also published original research.

Printed work:

- Tratado da sphera com a Theorica do Sol e da Lua (Treatise on the Sphere with the theory of the Sun and the Moon), (1537). From Tractatus de Sphæra by Johannes de Sacrobosco, Theoricae novæ planetarum by Georg Purbach and the Geography by Claudius Ptolemaeus. Included original texts: Tratado em defensam da carta de marear (Treatise in defense of the nautical chart), (1537); Tratado sobre certas dúvidas da navegação (Treatise about some doubts of navigation), (1537)
- De crepusculis (About the Twilight), (1542).
- De crepusculis (in Latin). Lisboa: Luiz Rodrigues. 1542.
- De erratis Orontii Finæi (About the errors of Oronce Fine), (1546).
- Petri Nonii Salaciensis Opera, (1566). Expanded, corrected and reedited as De arte adque ratione navigandi in 1573.
- Livro de algebra en arithmetica y geometria (Book of Algebra in Arithmetics and Geometry), (1567).

Manuscripts:

- [Manuscrito de Florença] (Florence manuscript), (written in the period 1537-1540)

Some modern reprints:

- Obras (4 vol.), Academia das Ciências de Lisboa, Lisboa, 1940-1960 (No ISBN at the books' record at the Portuguese National Library)
- Obras (6 vol.), Fundação Calouste Gulbenkian, Lisboa, 2002–2011, ISBN 972-31-0985-9 and ISBN 972-31-1084-9 (two more volumes are likely to be published)
