= Mathematical practitioner =

A mathematical practitioner is a term applied to a range of craftsmen, technicians and teachers who used mathematics in a practical way, particularly between 1485 and 1840. In her foundational text, The Mathematical Practitioners of Tudor and Stuart England, Eva Germaine Rimington Taylor introduced the phrase in 1954. In this book she argued that without these "lesser men", the great scientists of that period would have had little impact. in a further volume Mathematical Practitioners of Hanoverian England, 1714–1840 published posthumously in 1966, she argued that by 1840 different specialities had developed within the category she had defined, that it no longer made sense to treat them as a coherent body of practitioners.

Lesley Cormack describes a mathematical practitioner as one of "those who know by doing", rather than a scholar or philosopher who is one of "those who know by thinking". Within the English context, Stephen Johnston has highlighted the distinction between the practice of mathematical practitioners and courtly mathematics and academic mathematics. He underlines the public nature of the mathematical practice, whose impact in various locations and circumstances exposed its utility through its successful performance.

When the Muscovy Company was founded in 1551, they commissioned Robert Recorde to write mathematical books for the use of their navigators. They aimed to provide the improved knowledge to enable their company to undertake more significant ocean voyages. Published in 1551, Pathway to Knowledge provided an outline of geometry through the first four books of Euclid’s Elements. A further volume, The Whetstone of Witte (1557), offered an explanation of Algebra, dedicated to the governors of the Muscovy Company in the hope of encouraging more exploration and trade initiatives.

== Types of mathematical practitioners ==
Several types of mathematical practitioners have been identified:

=== Instrument makers ===
Cormack identifies instrument makers as constituting a specific type of mathematical practitioner. She argues that in the period 1550 to 1630 in London they constituted an active practical mathematical community. Having identified 85 different practitioners with shops or rooms in the city, she argues that their establishments were the venue where men of various backgrounds – gentry, scholars, merchants, instrument-makers, and navigators – would gather to discuss their shared interest in practical mathematics and instrument making.

=== Military mathematical practitioners ===
Researcher Steven Walton has identified a category of active soldiers and military engineers who consciously adopted a “mathematical posture” to broadcast how they applied mathematical methods in their pursuit of military goals.
