= Cyprian Lucar =

Cyprian Lucar (1544–1611) was an English mechanician and author.

== Life ==
He was born in London in 1544. His grandfather was John Lucar of Bridgwater, Somerset. His father, Emanuel Lucar, was a member of the Merchant Taylors' Company.

== Career ==
He was admitted as a scholar of Winchester College in 1555, and became fellow of New College, Oxford, before 1564. In 1568 he entered Lincoln's Inn.

== Bibliography ==
His most well-known works are:

- Three Bookes of Colloquies concerning the Arte of Shooting in great and small peeces of Artillerie
- A Treatise named Lvcarsolace Devided into Fower Bookes, which in part are collected out of diuerse authors in diuerse languages, and in part deuised by Cyprian Lucar Gentleman
