= Pierre Vernier =

French mathematician

A Vernier caliper using the scale invented by Pierre Vernier

Pierre Vernier (French pronunciation: [pjɛʁ vɛʁnje]; 19 August 1580 at Ornans, Franche-Comté (at that time ruled by the Spanish Habsburgs, now part of France) – 14 September 1637, same location) was a mathematician and instrument inventor. He was the inventor and eponym of the vernier scale used in measuring devices.

== Life ==
Vernier caliper scales; main at top, vernier at bottom. It reads 3.58 mm ± 0.02 mm by adding 3.00 mm (left red mark) on the fixed main scale to vernier 0.58 mm (right red mark). The main scale reading is the rightmost graduation that is to the left of the zero on the vernier scale. The vernier reading is found by locating the best aligned lines between the two scales. The 0.02 mm engraving indicates the caliper's accuracy and is the "Vernier constant" for this scale.

He was born in Ornans, France, in 1580. He was taught science by his father. He became captain and castellan of the castle at Ornans, for the King of Spain. He was also later councillor and director general of economy in the County of Burgundy.

In Brussels, in the year 1631, Vernier published his treatise La construction, l'usage, et les propriétés du quadrant nouveau de mathématique, and dedicated it to the Infanta. In it, he described the ingenious device which now bears his name, the vernier scale.

To a quadrant with a primary scale in half degrees Vernier proposed to attach a movable sector, thirty-one half degrees in length but divided into thirty equal parts (each part therefore consisting of a half-degree plus one minute). In measuring an angle, minutes could be easily reckoned by noticing which division line of the sector coincided with a division line of the quadrant.

Christopher Clavius had earlier mentioned this idea but had not proposed to attach the scale permanently to the instrument.

The name vernier is now applied to the small movable scale attached to a caliper, sextant, barometer, or other graduated instrument and was given by Jérôme Lalande. Lalande showed that the previous name, nonius after Pedro Nunes, belonged more properly to a different contrivance. The name nonius continued to be applied to the vernier until the beginning of the 19th century.
