= Graduation (scale) =

Marks used to indicate points on a visual scale

A ruler with two linear scales: the metric and imperial. It includes shorter minor graduations and longer major graduations.

A graduation is a marking used to indicate points on a visual scale, which can be present on a container, a measuring device, or the axes of a line plot, usually one of many along a line or curve, each in the form of short line segments perpendicular to the line or curve. Often, some of these line segments are longer and marked with a numeral, such as every fifth or tenth graduation. The scale itself can be linear (the graduations are spaced at a constant distance apart) or nonlinear.

Linear graduation of a scale occurs mainly (but not exclusively) on straight measuring devices, such as a rule or measuring tape, using units such as inches or millimetres.

Graduations can also be spaced at varying spatial intervals, such as when using a logarithmic, for instance on a measuring cup, can vary in scale due to the container's non-cylindrical shape.

== Graduations along a curve ==
Circular graduations of a scale occur on a circular arc or limb of an instrument. In some cases, non-circular curves are graduated in instruments. A typical circular arc graduation is the division into angular measurements, such as degrees, minutes and seconds. These types of graduated markings are traditionally seen on devices ranging from compasses and clock faces to alidades found on such instruments as telescopes, theodolites, inclinometers, astrolabes, armillary spheres, and celestial spheres.

There can also be non-uniform graduations such as logarithmic or other scales such as seen on circular slide rules and graduated cylinders.

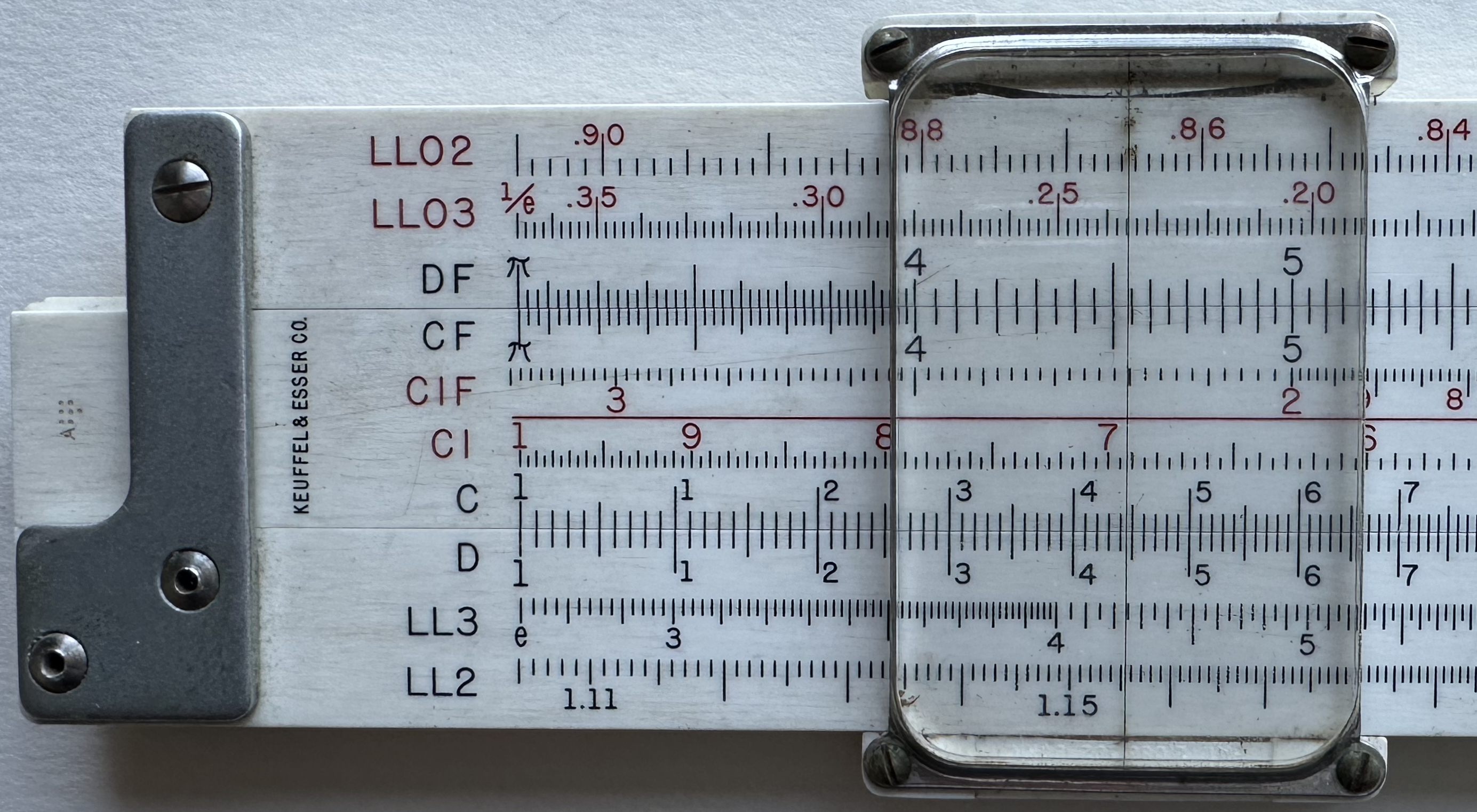
A slide rule. This is an example of a mathematical instrument with graduated logarithmic and log-log scales.

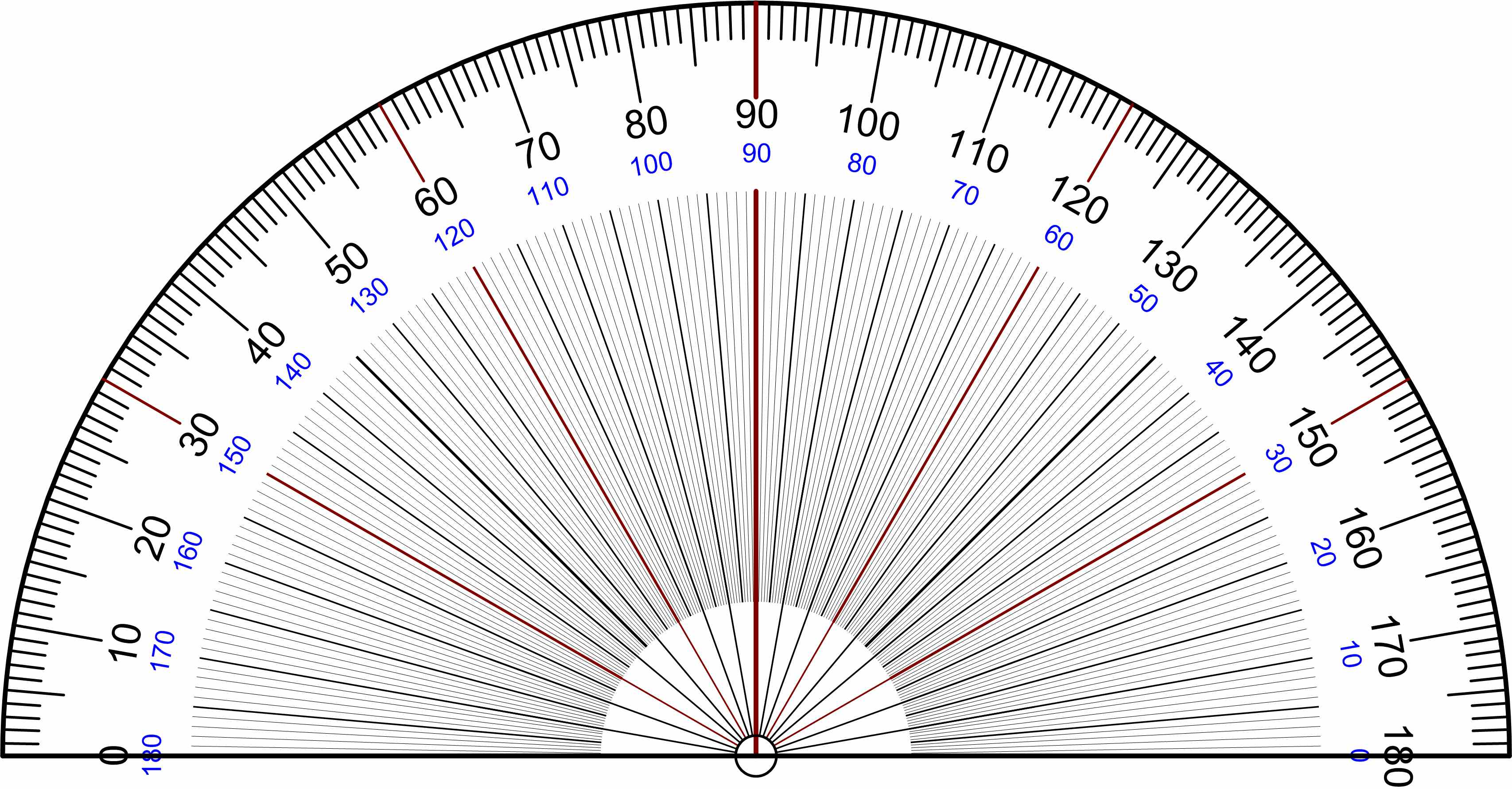
A half circle protractor graduated in degrees (180°).

== Manufacture of graduations ==
Graduations can be placed on an instrument by etching, scribing or engraving, painting, printing or other means. For durability and accuracy, etched or scribed marks are usually preferable to surface coatings such as paints and inks. Markings can be a combination of both physical marks such as a scribed line and a paint or other marking material. For example, it is common for black ink or paint to fill the grooves cut in a scribed rule. Inexpensive plastic devices can be molded and painted or molded with two or more colors of plastic used. Some rather high-quality devices can be manufactured with plastic and reveal high-precision graduations.

Graduations traditionally have been scribed into an instrument by hand with a sharp, hard tool. Later developments in devices such as dividing engines allowed the process to be automated with greater precision. Modern devices can be stamped, cut on a milling machine or with a CNC machine. In the case of stamping, the master has the precision built into itself and the stamped device is as accurate as the stamping process allows. Similarly, molding of plastic can be as precise as the mold process. With proper concern for such effects as thermal expansion or contraction and shrinkage, the precision can be very high.

== US graduation style ==
The US graduation style of an instrument was a Federal standard for codes used by manufacturers to quickly determine which types of scales are marked on the instrument.

Machinists rule graduations
Graduation No.	Faces	Edges
1	front	1/10″, 1/20″, 1/50″, 1/100″
		1/12″, 1/24″, 1/48″
	reverse	1/16″, 1/32″, 1/64″
		1/14″, 1/28″
2	front	1/10″, 1/20″, 1/50″, 1/100″
		1/12″, 1/24″, 1/48″
	reverse	1/16″, 1/32″, 1/64″
		1/8″
3	front	1/32″
		1/64″
	reverse	1/10″
		1/50″
4	front	1/32″
		1/64″
	reverse	1/8″
		1/16″
4-1	front	1/8″
		1/16″
	reverse	Same as front face, but from opposite end
		Same as front face, but from opposite end
5	front	1/32″
		1/64″
	reverse	1/10″
		1/100″
6-1	front	1/10″
		1/50″
	reverse	not graduated
		not graduated
6-2	front	1/10″
		1/10″
	reverse	1/50″
		1/50″
7	front	1/32″ (or 1/16″)
		1/64″ (or 1/32″)
	reverse	1/16″ (or 1/64″)
		1/100″
9	front	1/16″
		1/32″
	reverse	1/64″
		not graduated
10	front	1/32″
		1/64″
	reverse	not graduated
		not graduated
11	front	1/100″
		1/64″
	reverse	not graduated
		not graduated
12	front	1/50″
		1/100″
	reverse	not graduated
		not graduated
16	front	1/32″
		1/64″
	reverse	1/50″
		1/100″
M-1	front	1.0 mm
		0.5 mm
	reverse	not graduated
		not graduated
M-2	front	1.0 mm (or 1.0 and 0.5 mm)
		1.0 mm (or 1.0 and 0.5 mm)
	reverse	1.0 mm
		0.5 mm
ME-1	front	0.5 mm
		1/64″
	reverse	not graduated
		not graduated
ME-2	front	1.0 mm
		1/64″ (or 1/32″ and 1/64″)
	reverse	1.0 mm (or 1.0 and 0.5 mm)
		1/32″

Other commonly recognized styles are:

- 30–1 mm, 0.5 mm
- 31–1 mm, 0.5 mm, 1/32″, 1/64″
- 34–1 mm, 0.5 mm, 1/10″, 1/50″
- 35–1 mm, 0.5 mm on both sides
- 35E—1 mm, 0.5 mm on both sides, plus mm on both ends on one side
- 36—1/32″ and 1 mm on one side; 1/64″ and 1 mm on other side
- 37–1 mm, 0.5 mm
- 37E—1 mm, 0.5 mm on both sides, plus mm on both ends on one side, Single row inch figure
- E/M—edge 1: 1/10″, edge 2: 1/100″, edge 3: 1.0 mm, edge 4: 0.5 mm
- 3R—1/64″, 1/50″, 1/32″, 1/10″
- 4R—1/64″, 1/32″, 1/16″, 1/8″
- 5R—1/100″, 1/64″, 1/32″, 1/10″
- 6R—1/32″, 1/64″, 1/10″, 1/100″
- 7R—1/100″,1/64″, 1/32″, 1/16″
- 9R—1/16″, 1/32″, 1/64″
- 10R—1/32″, 1/64″ (quick-reading)
- 10R/D—1/64″, 1/32″, Decimal Equivalency Table Graduation
- 12R—1/100″, 1/64″, 1/50″, 1/32″
- 16R—1/100″, 1/64″, 1/50″, 1/32″

Suffix key:

- R = Rapid Read (32nd & 64th graduations marked with number values)
- E = End Graduations (Graduations appear on end edge/edges)
- ME = Metric/English (Metric units in preferred position)
- E/M = English/Metric (English units in preferred position)

== See also ==
- Level staff
- Monochord
- Volumetric flask
