= Alidade =

Device that allows one to sight a distant object

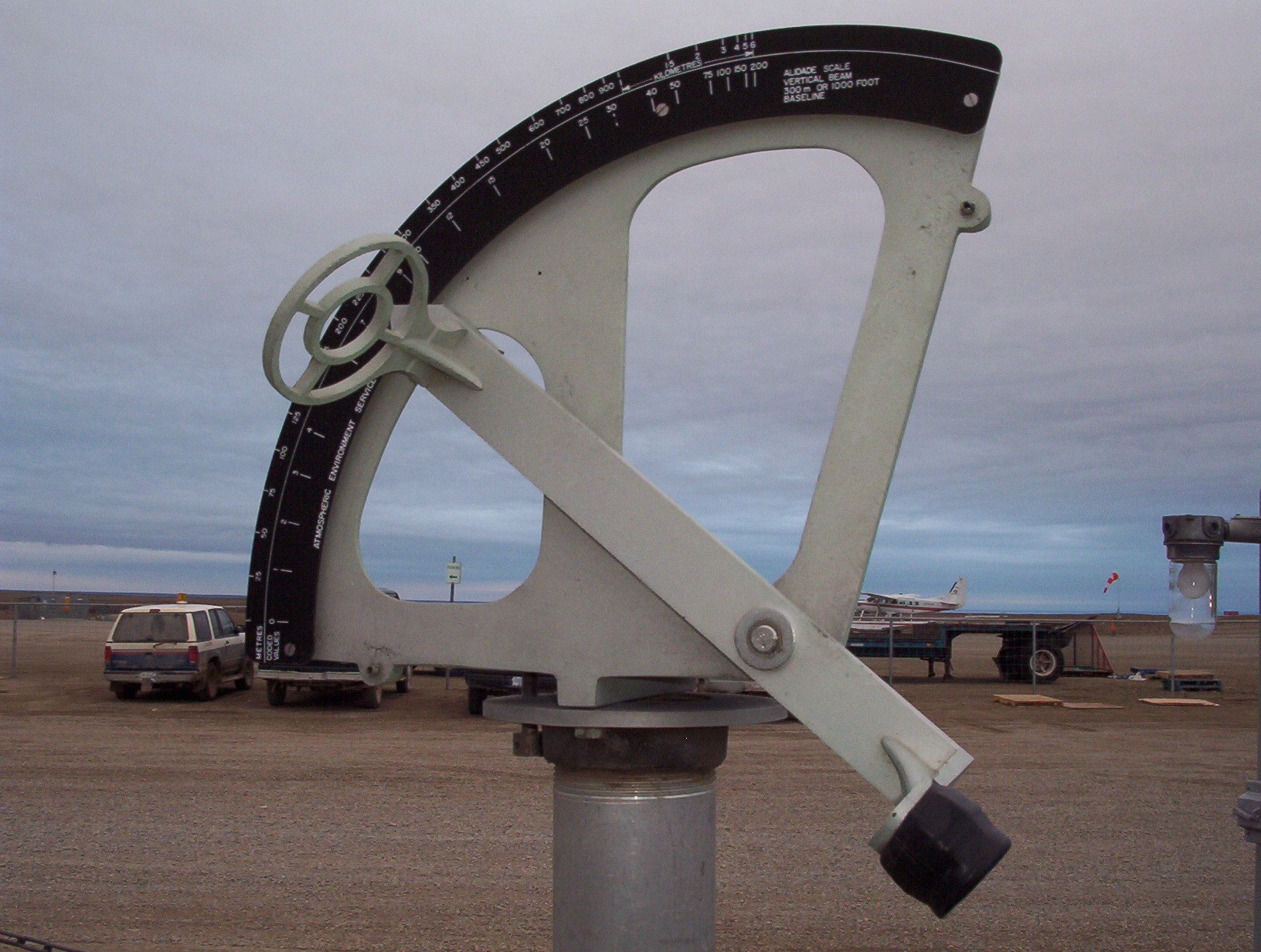
A simple alidade for use with a ceiling projector

An alidade (/ˈæ.lɪ.deɪd/) (archaic forms include alhidade, alhidad, alidad) or a turning board is a device that allows one to sight a distant object and use the line of sight to perform a task. This task can be, for example, to triangulate a scale map on site using a plane table drawing of intersecting lines in the direction of the object from two or more points or to measure the angle and horizontal distance to the object from some reference point's polar measurement. Angles measured can be horizontal, vertical or in any chosen plane.

The alidade sighting ruler was originally a part of many types of scientific and astronomical instrument. At one time, some alidades, particularly using circular graduations as on astrolabes, were also called diopters. With modern technology, the name is applied to complete instruments such as the 'plane table alidade'.

== Origins ==
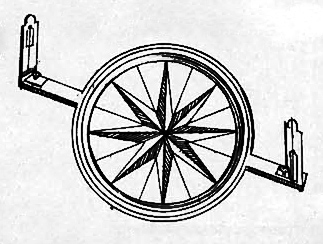
An example of an alidade on a circumferentor. Taken from the Table of Surveying, Cyclopaedia, Volume 2, 1728

The word in Arabic (الحلقة العضدية, al-ḥilqa al-ʿaḍudiyya, lit. 'the ruler'), signifies the same device. In Greek and Latin, it is respectively called δίοπτρα, "dioptra", and linea fiduciae, "fiducial line".

The earliest alidades consisted of a bar, rod or similar component with a vane on each end. Each vane (also called a pinnule or pinule) has a hole, slot or other indicator through which one can view a distant object. There may also be a pointer or pointers on the alidade to indicate a position on a scale. Alidades have been made of wood, ivory, brass and other materials.

== Examples of old alidade types ==
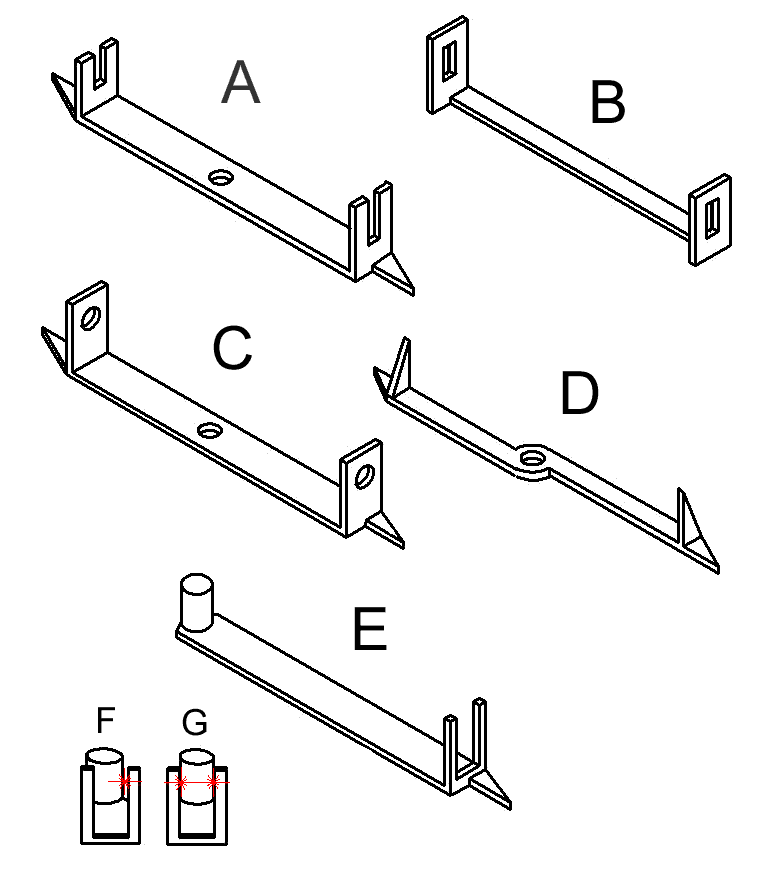
Several examples of alidade types.

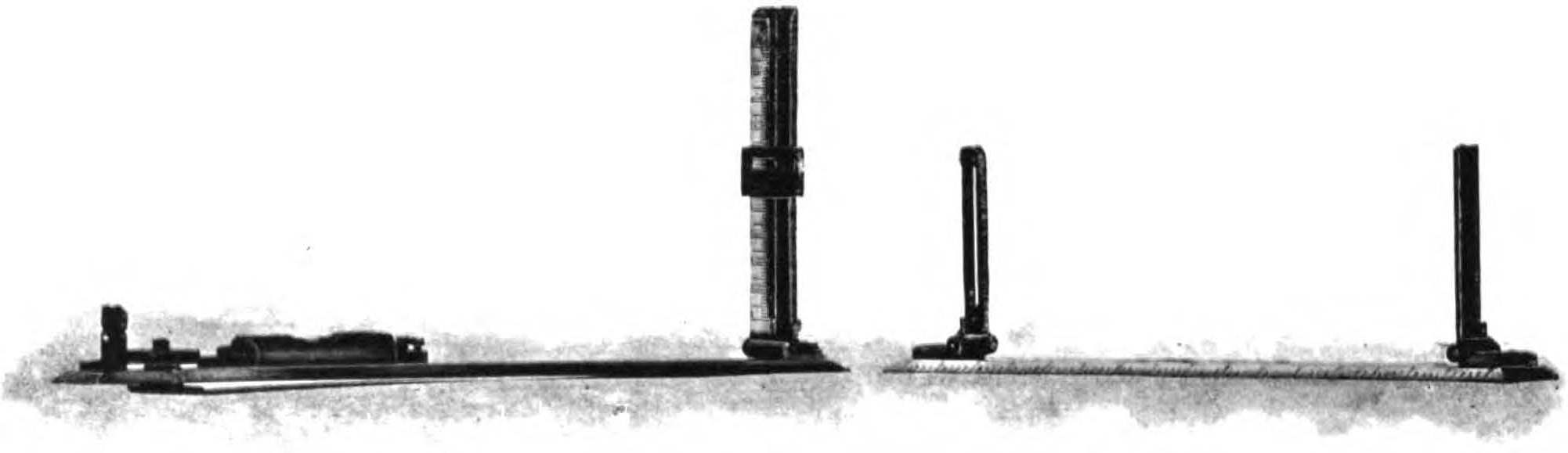
Traverse plane-table alidade, c. 1898

The figure on the left displays drawings that attempt to show the general forms of various alidades that can be found on many antique instruments. Real alidades of these types could be much more decorative, revealing the maker's artistic talents as well as his technical skills. In the terminology of the time, the edge of an alidade at which one reads a scale or draws a line is called a fiducial edge.

Alidade B in the diagram shows a straight, flat bar with a vane at either end. No pointers are used. The vanes are not centred on the bar but offset so that the sight line coincides with the edge of the bar.

The vanes have a rectangular hole in each with a fine wire held vertically in the opening. To use the alidade, the user sights an object and lines it up with the wires in each vane. This type of alidade could be found on a plane table, graphometer or similar instrument.

Alidades A and C are similar to B but have a slit or circular hole without a wire. In the diagram, the openings are exaggerated in size to show the shape; they would be smaller in a real alidade, perhaps 2 mm or so in width. One can look through the openings and line the openings up with the object of interest in the distance. With a small opening, the error in sighting the object is small. However, if a dim object such as a star is observed through a small hole, the image is difficult to see.

This form is shown in the diagram as having pointers. These can be used to read off an angle on a scale that is engraved around the outer edge (or limb) of the instrument. Alidades of this form are found on astrolabes, mariner's astrolabes and similar instruments.

Alidade D has vanes without any openings. In this case, the object is viewed and the alidade is rotated until the two opposite vanes simultaneously eclipse the object. With skill, this sort of alidade can yield very precise measures. In this example, pointers are shown.

Alidade E is a representation of a very interesting design by Johannes Hevelius. Hevelius was following in Tycho Brahe's footsteps and cataloging star positions with high accuracy. He did have access to the telescopic sights that were being used by astronomers in other countries, however, he chose to use naked-eye observations for his positional instruments. Due to the design of his instruments and the alidades, as well as his diligent practices, he was able to yield very precise measures.

Hevelius' design featured a pivot point with a vertical cylinder and a vane at the observer's end. The vane had two narrow slits that were spaced precisely the same distance apart as the diameter of the cylinder (in the diagram, the portion of the vane between the slits is removed for clarity; the left and right edges of the opening represent the slits). If the observer could sight a star on only one side of the cylinder, as seen in F, the alignment was off. By carefully moving the vane so that the star could just barely be seen on either side of the cylinder (G), the alidade was aligned with the position of the star. This could not be used with a closely located object. A star, being so far away as to exhibit no parallax to the naked-eye, would be observable as a point source simultaneously on both sides.

== Modern alidade types ==
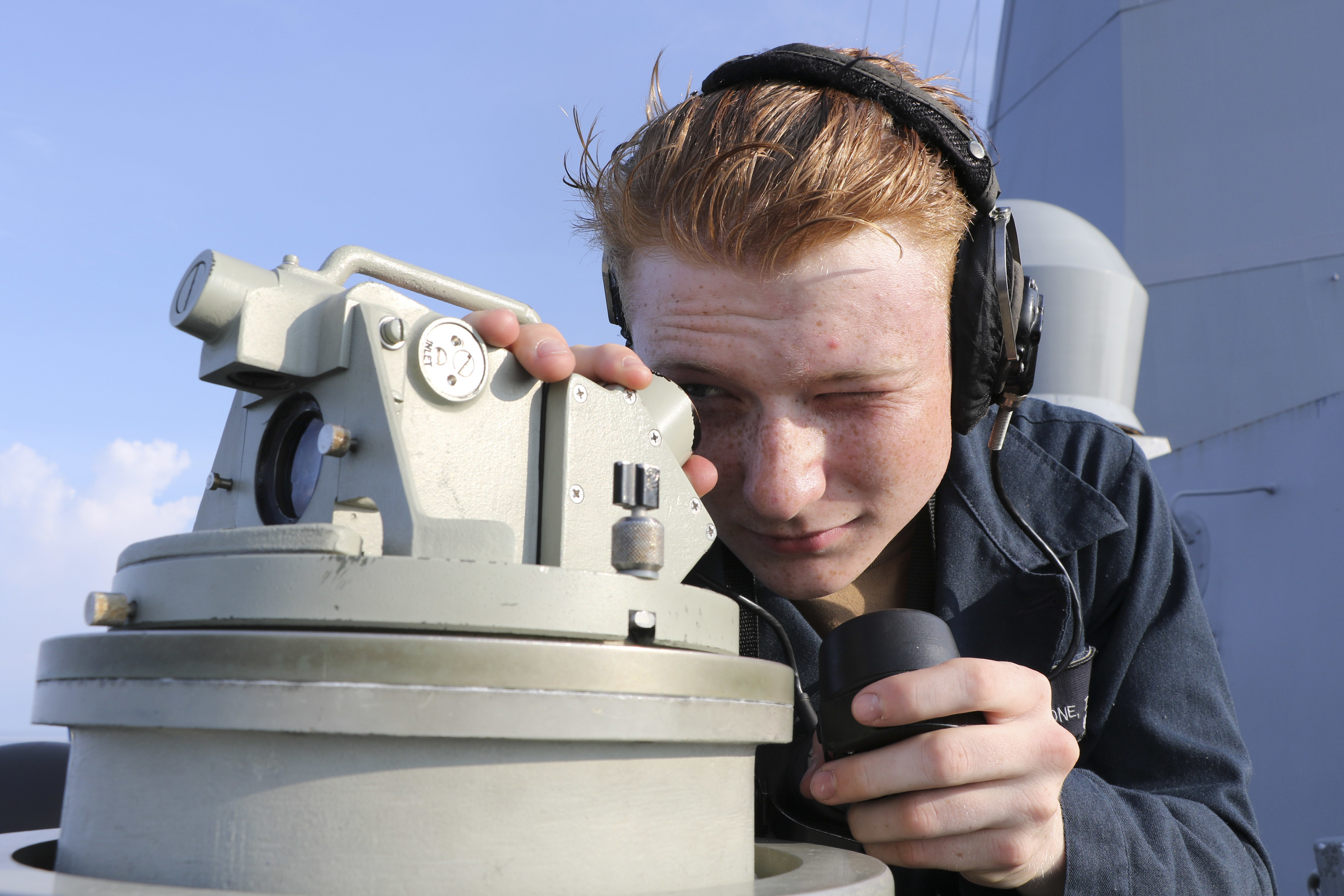
A U.S. Navy sailor using a telescopic alidade

The alidade is the part of a theodolite that rotates around the vertical axis, and that bears the horizontal axis around which the telescope (or visor, in early telescope-less instruments) turns up or down.

In a sextant or octant the alidade is the turnable arm carrying a mirror and an index to a graduated circle in a vertical plane. Today it is more commonly called an 'index arm'.

Alidade tables have also long been used in fire towers for sighting the bearing to a forest fire. A topographic map of the local area, with a suitable scale, is oriented, centered and permanently mounted on a leveled circular table surrounded by an arc calibrated to true north of the map and graduated in degrees (and fractions) of arc. Two vertical sight apertures are arranged opposite each other and can be rotated along the graduated arc of the horizontal table. To determine a bearing to a suspected fire, the user looks through the two sights and adjusts them until they are aligned with the source of the smoke (or an observed lightning strike to be monitored for smoke). See Osborne Fire Finder.

== See also ==
- Gunsight
- Pelorus (instrument)
