= List of medieval and pre-modern Iranian doctors =

The following is a non-comprehensive list of Iranian doctors that lived from medieval times up until the beginning of the modern age.

By "Iranian", all the peoples of historic Persia are meant, i.e., what is today Iran, Afghanistan, and all the countries of Central Asia ("common modern definition") that were historically part of the Persian empire, whether or not such people were ethnic Persians or Iranians. In some cases, their exact ancestry is unclear. They may have emigrated or immigrated, and thus may appear in other "Lists of", but nevertheless their names and work are somehow linked to the words "Iranian" and/or "Persian".

== A ==
- Abdolrahman, Sheikh Muhammad
- Abhari, mathematician
- Ahmad ibn Farrokh
- Ahmad Ibn Imad ul-din and chemist
- Al-Qumri, Persian physician
- Al-Nafis, Persian physician
- Amuli, Muhammad ibn Mahmud
- Aqa-Kermani
- Aqsara'i
- Arzani, Muqim
- Astarabadi
- Avicenna (Ibn Sina), philosopher

== B ==
- Bukhtishu, Persian Christian physicians of Academy of Gundishapur
- Bukhtishu, Abdollah ibn
- Bukhtishu, Gabriel ibn
- Bukhtishu, Yuhanna
- Burzoe, aka Borzouyeh-i Tabib of Academy of Gundishapur

== C ==
- Ctesias

== E ==
- Esfarayeni

== G ==
- Gilani, Hakim, royal physician
- Gorgani, Zayn al-Din Isma‘il ibn, royal physician
- Gorgani, Rustam
- Gorgani e Masihi, see Masihi Gorgani, Avicenna's master

== H ==
- Hajji Zayn al-Attar
- Hakim Ghulam Imam
- Hakim Muhammad Mehdi Naqi
- Hakim Muhammad Sharif Khan
- Haly Abbas, prominent physician
- Harawi, Muhammad ibn Yusuf
- Hasani, Qavameddin

== J ==
- Jaghmini
- Jaldaki
- Juzjani, Abu Ubaid

== K ==
- Kazerouni, Masoud
- Kermani, Iwad
- Khazeni, Abolfath, physicist
- Khorasani, Sultan Ali

== M ==
- Majusi, Ibn Abbas
- Masihi Gorgani, Avicenna's master
- Muwaffaq, Abu mansur, pharmacologist
- Masawaiyh or Masuya

== N ==
- Nagawri
- Nakhshabi
- Natili Tabari
- Neishaburi
- Nurbakhshi
- Nikpour

== O ==
- Ostanes

== Q ==
- Qazwini, Zakariya

== R ==
- Razi, Zakariya (Rhazes), chemist and physicist, discoverer of Alcohol

== S ==
- Sahl, Shapur ibn
- Samarqandi, Najibeddin
- Shahrazuri, philosopher and physician
- Shirazi, Imad al-Din Mas'ud
- Shirazi, Muhammad Hadi Khorasani
- Shirazi, Mahmud ibn Ilyas
- Shirazi, Najm al-Din Mahmud ibn Ilyas
- Shirazi, Qurayshi
- Sijzi, Mas'ud

== T ==
- Tabari, Abul Hasan
- Tabari, Ibn Sahl, Jewish convert physician Master of Rhazes
- Tabrizi, Maqsud Ali
- Tunakabuni
- Tughra'i

== V ==
- Amin al-Din Rashid al-Din Vatvat, scholar and physician

== See also ==
- List of Iranian scientists
- Nizamiyya
- Academy of Gondishapur
- Modern Iranian scientists and engineers
- List of universities in Iran
- Darolfonoon
- Higher education in Iran
- Islamic scholars
- Ophthalmology in medieval Islam
- Astronomy in Islam
