= List of pre-modern Iranian scientists and scholars =

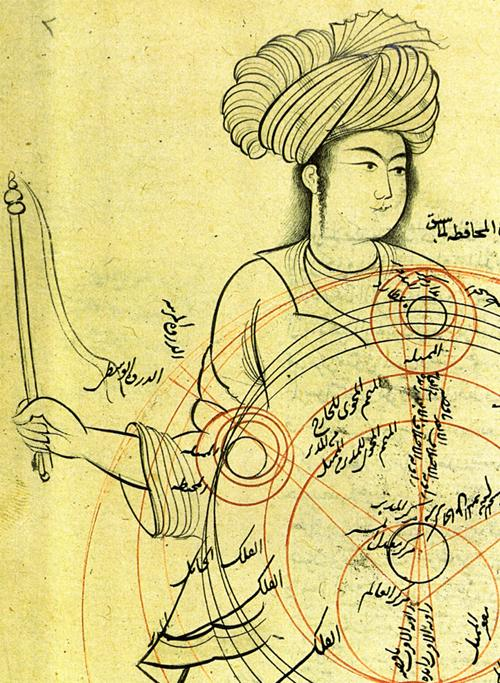
Photo taken from medieval manuscript by Qutb al-Din al-Shirazi. The image depicts an epicyclic planetary model.

The following is a list of Iranian scientists, engineers, and scholars who lived from antiquity up until the beginning of the modern age.

== A ==
- Abdul Qadir Gilani (12th century) theologian and philosopher
- Abu al-Qasim Muqane'i (10th century) physician
- Abu Dawood (c. 817–889), Islamic scholar
- Abu Hanifa (699–767), Islamic scholar
- Abu Said Gorgani (10th century)
- 'Adud al-Dawla (936–983), scientific patron
- Ahmad ibn Farrokh (12th century), physician
- Ahmad ibn 'Imad al-Din (11th century), physician and chemist
- Alavi Shirazi (1670–1747), royal physician in Mughal India
- Amuli, Muhammad ibn Mahmud (c. 1300–1352), physician
- Abū Ja'far al-Khāzin (900–971), mathematician and astronomer
- Ansari, Khwaja Abdullah (1006–1088), Islamic scholar
- Aqa-Kermani (18th century), physician
- Aqsara'i (?–1379), physician
- Abu Hafsa Yazid, physician
- Arzani, Muqim (18th century), physician
- Astarabadi (15th century), physician
- Aufi, Muhammad (1171–1242), scientist and historian
- Albubather, physician and astrologer
- Ibn Abi al-Ashʿath, physician
- Abu al-Hassan al-Amiri, theologian and philosopher
- Abu al-Hasan al-Ahwazi, mathematician and astronomer

== B ==
- Brethren of Purity
- Bahmanyār, philosopher
- Al-Baghawi (c. 1041–1122), Islamic scholar
- Bahāʾ al-dīn al-ʿĀmilī (1547–1621), poet, philosopher, architect, mathematician, astronomer
- Baha Al-Dowleh Razi (died c. 915), physician
- Al-Baladhuri (?–892), historian
- Abu Ali Bal'ami (10th century), historian
- Abu Ma'shar al-Balkhi (787–886), known in Latin as Albumasar, astrologer
- Abu Zayd al-Balkhi (850–934), geographer and mathematician
- Banū Mūsā brothers (9th century)
- Abu'l-Fadl Bayhaqi, historian
- Abu'l-Hasan Bayhaqi, historian and Islamic scholar
- Al-Bayhaqi, faqih and muhadith
- Muhammad Baqir Behbahani (1706–1791), theologian
- Bubares (died after 480 BC), engineer
- Ibn Bibi (13th century), historian of the Seljuks of Rum
- Biruni (973–1048), astronomer and mathematician
- Muhammad al-Bukhari (810–870), Islamic scholar
- Sahl ibn Bishr (c. 786–845?), astrologer, mathematician
- Bukhtishu (8th century?), Persian Christian physician of Academy of Gundishapur
- Bukhtishu, Abdollah ibn (c. 940–1058), Christian physician in Persia
- Jabril ibn Bukhtishu (9th century), Christian physician
- Bukhtishu, Yuhanna (9th century), Christian physician
- Borzuya (6th century), a.k.a. Borzouyeh-i Tabib, physician of Academy of Gundishapur
- Bibi Monajemeh Nishaburi (13th century), mathematician and astronomer
- Birjandi (?–1528), astronomer and mathematician
- Muhammad Bal'ami, historian
- Abu Bakr Rabee Ibn Ahmad Al-Akhawyni Bokhari, physician
- Abu'l-Fadl al-Bal'ami

== D ==
- Abu Hanifa Dinawari (815–896), astronomer, agriculturist, botanist, metallurgist, geographer, mathematician, and historian
- Ibn Durustawayh (872–958), grammarian, lexicographer and student of the Quran and hadith
- Ibn Qutaybah Dinwari (828–885), historian and theologian

== E ==
- Abubakr Esfarayeni (13th century?), physician

== F ==
- Al-Farghani (d. 880), astronomer, known in Latin as Alfraganus
- Al-Farabi (872–950) (Al-Farabi, Pharabius), philosopher
- Fazari, Ibrahim (?–777), mathematician and astronomer
- Fazari, Mohammad (?–796), mathematician and astronomer
- Feyz Kashani, Mohsen (?–1680), theologian
- Firishta (1560–1620), historian
- Ibn al-Faqih, historian and geographer
- Muhammad ibn Abi Bakr al‐Farisi (d. 1278/1279), astronomer
- Fazlallah Khunji Isfahani (1455–1521), religious scholar, historian and political writer

== G ==
- Gardizi (?–1061), geographer and historian
- Ghazali (Algazel, 1058–1111), philosopher
- Gilani, Hakim (?–1609), royal physician
- Kushyar Gilani (971–1029), mathematician, geographer, astronomer
- Zayn al-Din Gorgani (1041–1136), royal physician
- Rostam Gorgani (16th century), physician
- Al-Masihi (?–999), Avicenn'a master

== H ==
- Hakim Ghulam Imam, physician
- Hakim Muhammad Mehdi Naqi (18th century), physician
- Hakim Muhammad Sharif Khan (18th century), physician
- Hakim Nishaburi (933–1012), Islamic scholar
- Hallaj (858–922), mystic-philosopher
- Hamadani, Mir Sayyid Ali (1314–1384), poet and philosopher
- Harawi, Abolfadl (10th century), astronomer of Buyid dynasty
- Harawi, Muwaffak (10th century), pharmacologist
- Harawi, Muhammad ibn Yusuf (d. 1542), physician
- Hasani, Qavameddin (17th century), physician
- Ibn Hindu (1019–1032), man of letters, physician
- Haji Bektash Veli, mystic
- Ayn al-Quzat Hamadani, jurisconsult, mystic, philosopher, poet and mathematician
- Haseb Tabari, astronomer
- Hammam ibn Munabbih, Islamic scholar
- Hamza al-Isfahani (ca. 893–after 961), philologist and historian
- Abu Ja'far ibn Habash

== I ==
- Ibn Abi Sadiq (11th century), "The Second Hippocrates", Avicenna's disciple
- Ibn Isfandiyar (13th-century), historian
- Ibn Khordadbeh (c. 820–912), geographer
- Ibn Rustah (9th century), explorer and geographer
- Ilaqi, Yusef (11th century), Avicenna's pupil
- Mansur ibn Ilyas (14th century), physician
- Ibn Sina (Avicenna, 980–1037), philosopher and physician
- Isfahani, Imad al-Din (1125–1201) historian and rhetorician
- Isfahani, Jalaleddin (19th century), physician
- Isfahani, Husayn (15th century), physician
- Istakhri (?–957), geographer, gives the earliest known account of windmills
- Iranshahri (9th century), philosopher, teacher of Abu Bakr al-Razi
- Al-Isfizari (11th–12th century), mathematician and astronomer

== J ==
- Jabir ibn Hayyan (9th century), alchemist, pharmacist, philosopher, physicist, astronomer
- Jaghmini (14th century), physician
- Juwayni (1028–1085), philosopher, theologian
- Juzjani, Abu Ubaid (?–1070), physician
- Jamal ad-Din Bukhari (13th century), astronomer
- Jamasp, sage and philosopher
- Al-Abbās ibn Said al-Jawharī (800–860), geometer

== K ==
- Karaji (953–1029), mathematician
- Jamshid-i Kashani (c. 1380–1429), astronomer and mathematician
- Kashfi, Jafar (1775/6–1850/1), theologian
- Sadid al-Din al-Kazaruni (14th century), physician
- Kermani, Iwad (15th century), physician
- Kermani, Shams-ud-Din, Islamic scholar
- Al-Khazini (c. 1130), physicist
- Khayyam, Omar (1048–1131), poet, mathematician, and astronomer
- Khorasani, Sultan Ali (16th century), physician
- Al-Kharaqī, astronomer and mathematician
- Khujandi (c. 940–c. 1000), mathematician and astronomer
- Muhammad ibn Musa al-Khwarizmi (a.k.a. Al-Khwarazmi, c. 780–c. 850), creator of algorithm and algebra, mathematician and astronomer
- Najm al-Dīn al-Qazwīnī al-Kātibī, logician and philosopher
- Shams al-Din al-Khafri, astrologer
- Abū Sahl al-Qūhī, mathematician and astronomer
- Kubra, Najmeddin (1145–1220)
- Abu Ishaq al-Kubunani (d. after 1481), mathematician, astronomer
- Abu Zayn Kahhal, physician

== M ==
- Al-Mada'ini (752/753–843), historian
- Mahani (9th century), mathematician and astronomer
- Majusi, Ibn Abbas (?–c. 890), physician
- Marvazi, Abu Taher (12th century), philosopher
- Habash al-Hasib al-Marwazi, mathematician, astronomer, geographer
- Masawaiyh (777–857), or Masuya
- Mashallah ibn Athari (740–815), of Jewish origins, from Khorasan who designed the city of Baghdad based on Firouzabad
- Miskawayh (932–1030), philosopher
- Sharaf al-Zaman al-Marwazi, physician
- Hamdallah Mustawfi (1281–1349), geographer
- Mulla Sadra (1572–1640), philosopher
- Ibn al-Muqaffa' (?–756), founder of Arabic prose along with Abdol-Hamid
- bin Musa, Hasan (9th century), astronomer, mathematician
- bin Musa, Ahmad (9th century), astronomer, inventor
- bin Musa, Muhammad (9th century), astronomer, mathematician
- Muhammad ibn Muhammad Tabrizi (13th century), philosopher
- Abu Mansur al-Maturidi, Islamic scholar
- Muqatil ibn Sulayman, mufassir of Quran
- Ibn Manda, Hadith scholar
- Abu Ahmad Monajjem (241/855-56–in 13 Rabi' I 300/29 October 912), music theorist, literary historian
- Masarjawaih (7th century), physician
- Muhammad Abdolrahman, physician

== N ==
- Nagawri (14th century), physician
- Nahavandi, Benjamin, Jewish scholar
- Nahavandi, Ahmad (9th century), astronomer
- Nakhshabi (14th century), physician
- Narshakhi (899–959), historian
- Nasir Khusraw (1004–1088), scientist, Ismaili scholar, mathematician, philosopher, traveler and poet
- Natili Tabari (10th century), physician
- Naubakht (9th century), designer of the city of Baghdad
- Naubakht, Fadhl ibn (8th century), astronomer
- Nawbakhty (4th Hijri century), Islamic scholar, philosopher
- Nizam al-Din Nishapuri, mathematician, astronomer, jurist, exegete, and poet
- Nawbakhti, Ruh (10th century), Islamic scholar
- Nayrizi (865–922), mathematician and astronomer
- Naqshband, Baha ud-Din (1318–1389), philosopher
- Abu al-Qasim al-Habib Neishapuri (18th century), physician
- Muslim ibn al-Hajjaj (c. 815–875), Islamic scholar
- Nurbakhshi (16th century), physician
- Abu Hafs Umar an-Nasafi, theologian, mufassir, muhaddith and historian
- Al-Nasa'i, hadith collector
- Shihab al-Din Muhammad al-Nasawi, historian and biographer
- Abu Nu`aym, Islamic scholar

== O ==
- Ostanes, ancient Persian alchemist

== P ==
- Paul the Persian (6th century), philosopher

== Q ==
- Qazwini, Zakariya (1203–1283), physician
- Qumi, Qazi Sa’id (1633–1692), theologian
- Qumri (10th century), physician
- Ali Qushji (1403–16 December 1474), mathematician, astronomer and physician
- Ali al-Qari, Islamic scholar
- Ali Ibn Ibrahim Qomi, jurist and Shia scholar
- Al-Quda'i (d. 1062), judge, preacher and historian in Fatimid Egypt

== R ==
- Fakhr al-Din al-Razi (1150-1210), islamic theologian, physician, astronomer
- Razi, Amin (16th century), geographer
- Razi, Zakariya (Rhazes) (c. 865–925), chemist, physician, and philosopher
- Razi, Najmeddin (1177–1256), mystic
- Rumi, Jalal ad-Din Muhammad (1207–1273), Muslim poet, jurist, Islamic scholar, theologian, and Sufi mystic
- Rashid-al-Din Hamadani (1247–1318), historian, physician and politician
- Abu Hatim Ahmad ibn Hamdan al-Razi, Ismaili philosopher
- Rudaki (858–941), Persian poet

== S ==
- Sabzevari, Mulla Hadi (1797–1873), poet and philosopher
- Saghani Ostorlabi (?–990), astronomer
- Sahl, Fadl ibn (?–818), astronomer
- Sahl, Shapur ibn (?–869), physician
- Samarqandi, Najibeddin (13th century), physician
- Samarqandi, Ashraf (c. 1250–c. 1310), mathematician, astronomer
- Samarqandi, Dawlatshah (1438–1495/1507) biographer
- Sarakhsi, Ahmad ibn al-Tayyib (9th century) historian and philosopher
- Sarakhsi, Muhammad ibn Ahmad (?–1096), Islamic scholar
- Ahmad ibn al-Tayyib al-Sarakhsi, historian, traveller
- Shahrastani (1086–1153), historian of religions
- Shahrazuri (13th century), philosopher and physician
- Shahrazuri, Ibn al-Salah (1181–1245), Islamic scholar
- Shaykh Tusi (996–1067), Islamic scholar
- Ibn Babawayh (923–991), theologian
- Ibn Sahl, mathematician, physicist
- Abu ul-Ala Shirazi (d. 1001 CE), physician
- Shaykh Muhammad ibn Thaleb, physician
- Shirazi, Imad al-Din Mas'ud (16th century), physician
- Shirazi, Muhammad Hadi Khorasani (18th century), physician
- Shirazi, Qutbeddin (1236–1311), astronomer
- Shirazi, Mahmud ibn Ilyas (18th century), physician
- Shirazi, Najm al-Din Mahmud ibn Ilyas (?–1330), physician
- Shirazi, Qurayshi (17th century), physician
- Shirazi, Sultan Waezin (1894–1971), theologian
- Sibawayh, linguist and grammarian
- Sijzi (c. 945–c. 1020), mathematician and astronomer
- Sijzi, Mas'ud (14th century), physician
- Abd al-Rahman al-Sufi (903–986), astronomer from Ray who invented the meridian ring
- Mūsā ibn Shākir, astronomer
- Suhrawardi, Shahab al-Din (1155–1191), philosopher
- Abu Sulayman Sijistani, philosopher
- ‘Abd ar-Razzaq as-San‘ani, Islamic scholar
- Zayn al-Din Omar Savaji, philosopher and logician
- Zeynalabdin Shirvani, geographer, philosopher and poet
- Abu Yaqub al-Sijistani, Ismaili philosopher
- Abu'l-'Anbas Saymari, astrologer

== T ==
- Tabarani, Abu al-Qasim (873–970), Islamic scholar
- Tabari Amoli (839–923), historian
- Tabari, ibn Farrukhan (?–815), astrologer and architect
- Tabari, Abul Hasan (10th century), physician
- Tabari, Ibn Sahl (c. 783–c. 858), Jewish convert physician, master of Rhazes
- Tabrizi, Maqsud Ali (17th century), physician
- Taftazani (1322–1390), theologian, linguist
- Tayfur, Ibn Abi Tahir (819–893), linguist
- Tirmidhi (824–892), Islamic scholar
- Tunakabuni (17th century), physician
- Tughra'i (c. 1061–1122), physician
- Tusi, Nizam ol-Molk (1018–1092), Persian scholar and vizier of the Seljuq Empire
- Tusi, Nasireddin (1201–1274), Persian polymath, architect, philosopher, physician, scientist, and theologian
- Tusi, Sharafeddin (?–1213/4), mathematician
- Ahmad ibn Muhammad al-Tha'labi, Islamic scholar
- 'Abd al-Hamīd ibn Turk, Persian or Turkish mathematician

== U ==
- Safi al-Din al-Urmawi (c. 1216–1294), musician
- Abu al‐Uqul al‐Tabari (14th century), Yemenite astronomer of Iranian origin

== V ==
- Amin al-Din Rashid al-Din Vatvat (13th century), scholar and physician

== W ==
- Waqidi (748–822), historian
- Wassaf, historian
- Al-Wabkanawi, astronomer

== Y ==
- Yaʿqūb ibn Ṭāriq (?–796), mathematician and astronomer
- Yunus ibn Habib, linguist
- Yahya ibn Ma'in, Islamic scholar
- Yunus al-Katib al-Mughanni, musician
- Yahya ibn Abi Mansur (d. 830 CE), astronomer

== Z ==
- Dawud al-Zahiri (815–834) theologian and historian
- Zamakhshari (1074/5–1143/4), scholar and geographer
- Muhammad Zarrindast (11th century), oculist
- Zayn-e-Attar (?–c. 1403), physician
- Zarir Jurjani (9th century), mathematician and astronomer
- Zakariya al-Qazwini (1203–1283) physician, astronomer, geographer, and proto-science fiction writer

== See also ==
- List of contemporary Iranian scientists, scholars, and engineers
- List of Iranian mathematicians
- Nizamiyya
- Academy of Gondishapur
- International rankings of Iran in science and technology
- List of Christian scientists and scholars of the medieval Islamic world
- List of pre-modern Arab scientists and scholars
