= Abu Said Gorgani =

Islamic mathematician and astronomer

Abu Sa'id Dharir Gurgani (ابوسعید ضریر گرگانی), also Gurgani, was a 9th-century Persian mathematician and astronomer from Gurgan, Iran. He wrote a treatise on geometrical problems and another on the drawing of the meridian. George Sarton considers him a pupil of Ibn al-A'rabi, but Carl Brockelmann rejects this opinion.

== Works ==
Two of his works are extant:

- Masa'il Hindisia (a manuscript is available in Cairo)
- Istikhraj khat nisf al-nahar min kitab analima wa al-borhan alayh (available in Cairo, translated by Carl Schoy)

== See also ==
- List of Iranian scientists

== Sources ==
- H. Suter. Mathematiker (12, 1900).
