= Abd al-Wajid =

Persian astronomer

ʿAbd al-Wājid
- عبد الواجد حنفی
- Born: Mashhad, Iran
- Died: 1434; Kütahya, Aegean Region, Ottoman Empire (Now Turkey)

Academic background
- Influences: Maragheh observatory, Shams al-Din al-Fanari, Jaghmīnī, Nasir al-Din al-Tusi, Qutb al-Din al-Shirazi

Academic work
- Main interests: Astronomy

Badr al-Dīn ʿAbd al-Wājid (or Wāḥid) ibn Muḥammad ibn Muḥammad al-Ḥanafī (Persian: عبدالواجب حنفی; died 1434) was a 15th century astronomer. He was born in Mashhad, in modern Iran, and died in Kütahya, in modern Turkey, He taught in the Ottoman Demirkapi Madrasa, a school for astronomical observation and instruction. The Demirkapi madrasa was later renamed as the Wājidiyya Madrasa in his honour.

Together with Qutb al-Din al-Shirazi, he brought the influence of the Maragheh observatory to Anatolia.

== Works ==
- Sharḥ al-Mulakhkhaṣ fī al-hayʾa ("A commentary on the Compendium of Astronomy"), a commentary on the work by Jaghmīnī. The commentary was dedicated to Sultan Murād II.
- Sharḥ Sī faṣl, a commentary on Ṭūsī's Persian work of astronomy. Translated into Turkish by Ahmed-i Dāʿī.
- Maʿālim al-awqāt wa-sharḥuhu, a work in the use of astrolabe written in verse using 552 couplets. Dedicated to Muḥammad Shāh (d. 1406), the son of al-Fanārī (d. 1431).

== Sources ==
- Topdemir, Hüseyin (2007). "Wābkanawī: Shams al-Munajjim [Shams al-Dīn] Muḥammad ibn ҁAlī Khwāja al-Wābkanawī [Wābkanawī]". In Hockey, Thomas; et al. (eds.). The Biographical Encyclopedia of Astronomers. Springer. pp. 1187–1188. doi:10.1007/978-0-387-30400-7_1433. ISBN 978-1-4419-9918-4. (PDF version)
