= Al-Amuli =

Al-Amuli or Amuli is a surname of Arabic origin. Notable people with the surname include:

- Muhammad ibn Mahmud Amuli, 14th century Persian physician
- Haydar Amuli (1319–1385), Persian Shi'ite mystic and Sufi philosopher, born in what is now Iran
- Al-Natili, 10th century Persian physician and translator

== See also ==
- Amoli (disambiguation)
