= Muhammad Ali Astarabadi =

Persian physician

Husayn ibn Muhammad ibn Ali al-Astarabadi was a 15th-century Persian physician from Astarabad, Golestan, Persia.

In 1427, he wrote his well-known commentary on Jaghmini's summary of The Canon of Medicine of Avicenna. Astarabadi dedicated it to Prince Murtada.

Little else is known of his life.

== See also ==
- List of Iranian scientists

== Sources ==
For information on his only known treatise, see:

- Carl Brockelmann, Geschichte der arabischen Litteratur, 1st edition, 2 vols. (Leiden: Brill, 1889–1936). Second edition, 2 vols. (Leiden: Brill, 1943–49). Page references will be to those of the first edition, with the 2nd edition page numbers given in parentheses. vol. 1, p. 457 (598)
- Carl Brockelmann, Geschichte der arabischen Litteratur, Supplement, 3 vols. (Leiden: Brill, 1937–1942), vol. 1, p. 826.
- A.Z. Iskandar, A Catalogue of Arabic Manuscripts on Medicine and Science in the Wellcome Historical Medical Library (London: The Wellcome Historical Medical Library, 1967), pp. 56–57 and 184.
- A.Z. Iskandar, A Descriptive List of Arabic Manuscripts on Medicine and Science at the University of California, Los Angeles (Leiden: Brill, 1984), p. 73.
