= Jalal Tabib Shirazi =

- Born: Shiraz
- Notable works: Flowers and Nowruz
- Relatives: Najm al-Din Mahmud ibn Ilyas al-Shirazi (cousin); Mansur ibn Ilyas (descendant)

Jalal Tabib Shirazi (Persian: جلال طبیب شیرازی) was a 14th-century poet and physician who worked under the Injuid and Muzaffarid dynasties in Iran. He is the author of Flowers and Nowruz, a love story composed in 1333/34 under the Injuid ruler Amir Ghiyath al-Din Kaykhosrow.

Since the previous century, Jalal's family had lived in Shiraz, having relocated from Khaf in Khorasan. He was a cousin of the physician Najm al-Din Mahmud ibn Ilyas al-Shirazi, and married to a member of the Fazl family. One of his descendants was the physician Mansur ibn Ilyas (died 1407). His date of death is unknown. According to one source he died in 1393, but this is unlikely, as a manuscript collection from 1383 containing some of Jalal's poems mentions him as deceased.

== Sources ==
- Pourjavadi, Nasrollah (2019). "جلال طبیب خوافی شیرازی". The Great Islamic Encyclopaedia (in Persian).
