= Albubather =

9th-century Persian physician and astrologer

Abu Bakr al-Hassan ibn al-Khasib, also al-Khaseb, Albubather in Latin, was a Persian physician and astrologer of the 9th century.

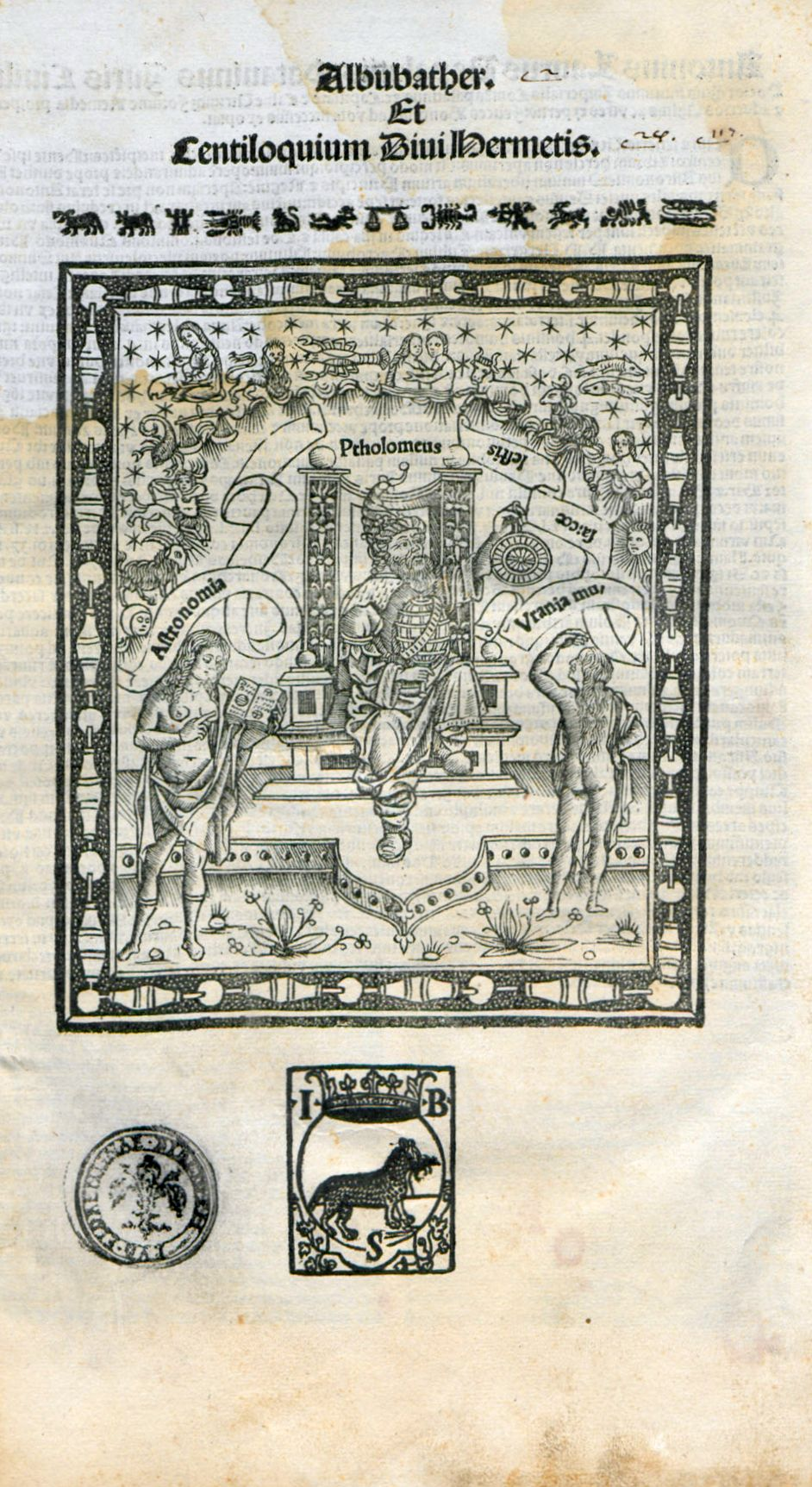
De nativitatibus, 1501

He wrote in Persian and Arabic and is best known for his work De nativitatibus which was translated into Latin by Canonicus Salio in Padua 1218, and was also translated into Hebrew. The first printed edition appeared in Venice in 1492, edited by Antonio Lauro, a Venetian prelate. It contains detailed descriptions of the influence of the planets, sun, moon and zodiac on a child throughout the gestation period, from physical characteristics to musical ability.

== Works ==
- De nativitatibus (in Latin). Venezia: Giovanni Battista Sessa (1.). 1501.

== See also ==
- List of Iranian scientists

== Sources ==
- Al-fihrist by Ibn al-Nadim, p. 276 and Commentary, p. 131.
- H. Suter : Die Mathematiker und Astronomen der Araber (32, 1900)
- Nachtrage (162, 1902)
- Encyclopedia of Islam, II, 274, 1916.
