= Vatvat =

There are two medieval Persian persons with closely similar names, but believed to be distinct:

- Rashid al-Din Vatvat, 12th century Persian royal panegyrist and epistolographer
- Amin al-Din Rashid al-Din Vatvat, 13th century Persian physician

The name may also refer to:

- Jamāl al-Dīn al-Waṭwāṭ, Egyptian encyclopaedist (632-718 AH/1235-1318 CE))
