= Amoli =

Amoli may refer to:

== People ==
- Abul-Abbas Qassab Amoli, 11th century Sufi mystic
- Taleb Amoli (1586–1627), Iranian poet
- Muhammad Taqi Amoli (1887–1971), Iranian jurist and philosopher
- Hashim Larijani, or Mirza Hashem Amoli (1899–1993), Iranian Islamic scholar
- Hassan Hassanzadeh Amoli (1929–2021), Iranian theologian
- Abdollah Javadi Amoli (born 1933), Iranian Islamic scholar and politician

== Other uses ==
- Amoli (film), a 2018 Indian documentary film
- Amoli, Almora, a village in Uttarakhand, India

== See also ==
- Al-Amuli, a surname
