= Ahmad ibn 'Imad al-Din =

Persian physician and alchemist

Aḥmad ibn ‘Imād al-Dīn, Ahmad ibn Imad ad-Din (Arabic: أحمد بن عماد الدين) was a Persian physician and alchemist. He was probably from Nishapur in the 11th century.

He was the author of an alchemical treatise titled On the Art of the Elixir (or Fi sina‘at al-iksir) which is preserved in the National Library of Medicine.

No other copy has been identified, and the author is not listed in the published bibliographies of Islamic writers on alchemy. He wrote the alchemical treatise titled On the Art of the Elixir (or Fi sina‘at al-iksir), in which he describes various chemical reactions.

The manuscript copy is undated, but appears to be of the 17th or 18th century. In it, there is extensive marginalia giving citations from Jābir ibn Hayyān.

== See also ==
- List of Iranian scientists
- Medical Encyclopedia of Islam and Iran
