= Muhammad Zarrindast =

Persian opnthalmologist

Abu Ruh Muhammad ibn Mansur ibn abi Abdallah ibn Mansur Jamani (also Gorgani), nicknamed Zarrin-Dast was an eleventh-century Persian oculist.

Zarrin Dast means the Golden Hand in Persian, a reputable name for an eye surgeon.

He flourished under the Seljuq sultan Abu-l-Fath Malikshah ibn Muhammad, ruling from 1072-73 to 1092–93.

He completed in 1087–88, a treatise on ophthalmology entitled "The Light of the Eyes" (Nur al-ayun), in Persian.

== Sources ==
- Hirschberg: Geschichte der Augenheilkunde bei den Arabern (57 sq., Leipzig, 1905).
- Adolf Fonahn: Quellenkunde der persischen Medizin (38-41, 1910. Includes summary of the treatise, based upon Hirschberg).

== See also ==
- List of Iranian scientists
