= Alavi Shirazi =

Persian physician

Hakim Muhammad Hashim Muslim ibn Hakim Muhammad Hadi Qalandar ibn Muzaffar al-Din ‘Alavi Shirazi (1670 - 1747), with the royal title Alavi Khan Nawwab Mu‘tamad al-Muluk, was a royal Persian physician of the 18th century Mughal India.

Hakim ‘Alavi Khan was born in Shiraz, in Persia, in 1670. In 1699 he went to India and presented himself at the Mughal, where he was appointed physician to Prince Muhammad Azam (who was later to rule for only three months in 1707). The Mughal ruler Bahadur Shah (reg. 1707-12) gave him the title ‘Alavi Khan.

Muhammad Shah (reg.1719-1748), the Mughal ruler in Delhi, raised him to the rank of Shash-hazari and gave him the title of Mu‘tamad al-Muluk. When the Persian ruler Nadir Shah defeated Muhammad Shah and sacked Delhi, ‘Alavi Khan accompanied Nadir Shah when he left India and ‘Alavi Khan accepted the position of Hakim-bashi ("chief physician") to Nadir Shah.

After making a pilgrimage to Mecca, ‘Alavi Khan returned to Delhi in 1743 and died there about four years later.

He wrote four medical treatises in Arabic and four in Persian. His nephew Muhammad Husayn ibn Muhammad Hadi al-‘Aqili al-‘Alavi al-Khurasani al-Shirazi (fl. 1771-81), known as Hakim Muhammad Hadikhan, used ‘Alavi Khan's pharmacopoeia titled Jami‘ al-javami‘-i Muhammad-Shahi, which was dedicated to the Mughal ruler Muhammad Shah, as the main source a large portion of his comprehensive work on simple and compound remedies written in 1771.

== Sources ==
For his life and writings, see:

- C.A. Storey, Persian Literature: A Bio-Bibliographical Survey. Volume II, Part 2: E.Medicine (London: Royal Asiatic Society, 1971, pp. 273–5 no. 475.
- Cyril Elgod, Safavid Medical Practice: or, The practice of medicine, surgery and gynaecology in Persia between 1500 A.D. and 1750 A.D. (London: Luzac, 1970), pp. 85–6.

== See also ==
- List of Iranian scientists
- Shiraz
