= Shaykh Muhammad ibn Thaleb =

Persian physician

Muhammad ibn Thalib ibn Abd Allah ibn Ni`mat Allah ibn Sadr ad-Din ibn Shaykh Baha' ad-Din ash-Shirazi (Arabic: محمد ابن طالب عبدالله ابن نعمات الله ابن صدر الدين ابن شيخ بهاءالدين الشيرازي) was a 15th-century Persian physician from Shiraz, Iran.

Muhammad ibn Thalib ash-Shirazi is known only by his extensive Arabic manual on diseases and "tested remedies" (mujarrabat). He composed it for an otherwise unknown person named al-Hasan ibn Abi Yahya ibn Barakat, whose name is mentioned in the title, which translates as "Useful Information for Hasan on Tested Medical Remedies". Only two copies are known, one at the National Library of Medicine (NLM) in the United States, and one in Dublin; the latter was copied in 1715, and therefore the author must have lived prior to that time.

Francis E. Sommer, who cataloged historical manuscripts for the NLM, states that Muhammad ibn Thalib Shirazi died in 1467.

== See also ==
- List of Iranian scientists
