= Sadid al-Din al-Kazaruni =

Physician

Sadid al-Din Muhammad ibn Mas‘ud al-Kazaruni was a 14th-century Persian physician from Kazerun, Fars, Iran.

He was a popular commentator on earlier medical writings, and composed a commentary titled al-Mughni fi sharh al-Mujiz on the epitome of The Canon of Medicine by Avicenna. Numerous copies of this popular commentary are preserved today, including at the National Library of Medicine.

He also composed a commentary on the materia medica that was part of the Canon of Medicine itself and a commentary on the first book of the Canon of Medicine, which he completed in 1344. In addition, al-Kazaruni wrote a biography of the Islamic prophet, Muhammad, which was translated from Arabic into Persian by his son 'Afif in 1383. From this latter translation, 18th century-Chinese Muslim scholar Liu Zhi also composed his own.

He died in 1357.

== Sources ==
- A. Z. Iskandar, A Catalogue of Arabic Manuscripts on Medicine and Science in the Wellcome Historical Medical Library (London: The Wellcome Historical Medical Library, 1967), pp. 50, 54–55
- Manfred Ullmann, Die Medizin im Islam, Handbuch der Orientalistik, Abteilung I, Ergänzungsband vi, Abschnitt 1 (Leiden: E.J. Brill, 1970), p. 272
- Carl Brockelmann, Geschichte der arabischen Litteratur, 1st edition, 2 vols. (Leiden: Brill, 1889–1936). Second edition, 2 vols. (Leiden: Brill, 1943–49). Page references are those of the first edition, with the 2nd edition page numbers given in parentheses. Vol. 2, p. 195 (249)
- Carl Brockelmann, Geschichte der arabischen Litteratur, Supplement, 3 vols. (Leiden: Brill, 1937–1942). Vol. 2, 262.

== See also ==
- List of Iranian scientists
