= Masʽud ibn Muhammad Sijzi =

Iranian physician

Masʽud ibn Muhammad Sijzi (Persian: مسعود بن محمد سجزی) was a Persian physician who lived before 1334CE in eastern Iran.

Little is known of the life of Masʽud ibn Muhammad al-Sijzi, only that he must have been working sometime before 1334CE. His only treatise, an Arabic medical compendium with emphasis on terminology titled The Truths of the Secrets of Medicine (Haqa'iq asrar al-tibb), was dedicated to a minor vizier in Baghdad by the name of Sadr al-Dawlah Abu al-Mufakar Qasim ibn ʽIraq ibn Jaʽfar.

== See also ==
- List of Iranian scientists

== Sources ==
For biographical sources and his treatise, see:

- Manfred Ullmann, Die Medizin im Islam, Handbuch der Orientalistik, Abteilung I, Erg?nzungsband vi, Abschnitt 1 (Leiden: E.J. Brill, 1970), p. 237
- A. Z. Iskandar, A Catalogue of Arabic Manuscripts on Medicine and Science in the Wellcome Historical Medical Library (London: The Wellcome Historical Medical Library, 1967), p. 104
- C. Brockelmann, Geschichte der arabischen Litteratur, Supplement, 3 vols. (Leiden: Brill, 1937–1942), vol. 2, p. 299
- Sami K. Hamarneh, Catalogue of Arabic Manuscripts on Medicine and Pharmacy at the British Library (Cairo: Les editions universitaires d'Egypte, 1975), p. 204.
