= Muhammad Abdolrahman =

Persian physician

Ali ibn Shaykh Muhammad ibn ‘Abd al-Rahman was a prominent Persian physician who is thought to have lived in the 17th century.

Little is known of this author. What is certain is that he composed a large Persian medical encyclopedia, in didactic verse, titled Jawahir al-maqal ("The Gems of Discourse") which is preserved in only two copies: one at The National Library of Medicine, and one in Oxford University.

It is thought that he was a rather recent figure, probably from the seventeenth century. But he must certainly have lived before 1791, when an owner's note was appended to the undated NLM manuscript.

== Sources ==
For the undated (18th-century) Oxford manuscript, see:

- E. Sachau and Hermann Ethé, Catalogue of the Persian, Turkish, Hindûstânî and Pushtû Manuscripts in the Bodleian Library. Part I: The Persian Manuscripts, Oxford: Clarendon Press, 1889, col. 969 no. 1609.

== See also ==
- List of Iranian scientists
- Medical Encyclopedia of Islam and Iran
