= Baha Al-Dowleh Razi =

9th-century Iranian physician

Baha al-dowleh Razi
- Born: Tehran
- Occupation: Physician

Baha Al-Dowleh Razi was an Iranian physician who lived in the 9th century. He was one of the greatest Iranian traditional medicine practitioners. He was likely born in Tehran, where he also completed his medical studies with his father.

== Innovation ==
Razi discovered many innovations in the field of detecting diseases such as whooping cough and syphilis. In Razi's writings, as was common with other Persian physicians, the disease syphilis is referred to as atashak. He also gave an early description of epithelial tuft cells and their possible role in the immune system and allergies. He implemented an early form of smallpox vaccination. He is the main source for a c. 977 paper Imad al-Shirazi. He used his father's techniques and followed him in Sufism and the elders of the way of life of the late 'King Hussein', entering Herat Afzal Nasir al-Din al-Kirmani monastery.

== Kholaseh Al-Tajarob ==
His short book "Kholaseh Al-tajarob" was one of the most respected authorities in the 'Safavieh' era of medicine. Doctors studied his father and other physicians such as, Hippocrates, Galen, bin Razi, Ibn Sina, SE Jorjani and an ophthalmologist named Amira.

Although the extent of topics and eloquently expressed Al-tajarob summary 'Kharazmshahi' is not to save, the better it is based on personal experience and innovation.

== Death ==
Baha Al-Dowleh died, according to the death of 'King Hussein Bayghara', circa year 915.

== See also ==
- List of Persian scientists and scholars
