= Muqim Arzani =

Persian physician

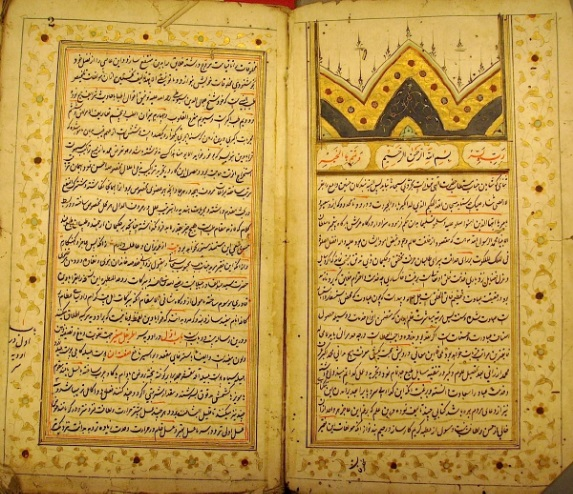
The opening of a manuscript of Arzani's Qarabadin-i Qadiri, dated 1792 (BL Delhi Persian 843B)

Muhammad Akbar ibn Mir Hajji Muhammad Muqim Arzani also known as Shah Mohammad Arzani Dehlavi was an 18th-century Persian physician in Mughal India.

Arzani was a celebrated Sufi physician of the late 17th and early 18th century. He composed many medical treatises, including the Qarabadin-i Qadiri, a pharmacopoeia written as a tribute to Sayyid Abd al-Qadir of Gilan (d. 1165CE) who was the founder of the Sufi order of which Arzani was a member.

Arzani also wrote a handbook of medicine for beginners (Mofarrah al'gholoob), a commentary on the Qanunchah by Jaghmini (a greatly abbreviated version of The Canon of Medicine by Avicenna); Tibb-i Akbari, composed in 1700CE, which was an expanded version of the Arabic treatise Sharh al-asbab wa-al-‘alamat by Burhan al-Din Nafis ibn ‘Iwad al-Kirmani; a Persian treatise on the illnesses occurring during pregnancy and breast-feeding and the diseases of infants; and Mujarrabat-i Akbari, a formulary of compound remedies.

== Books ==
- Teb Al-Akbar
- Ta'rif Al-Amraz
- Mofarah Al-Gholoob
- Mizan Al-Teb
- Mojriat Akbari
- Summarization of Teb Al-Anabi
- Mojriat Hendiat ("Indian tradition")

== See also ==
- List of Iranian scientists

== Sources ==
For his life and writings, see:

- C.A. Storey, Persian Literature: A Bio-Bibliographical Survey. Volume II, Part 2: E.Medicine (London: Royal Asiatic Society, 1971), p. 268 no 465
- Fateme Keshavarz, A Descriptive and Analytical Catalogue of Persian Manuscripts in the Library of the Wellcome Institute for the History of Medicine (London: Wellcome Institute for the History of Medicine, 1986), pp 57–58
- Lutz Richter-Bernburg, Persian Medical Manuscripts at the University of California, Los Angeles: A Descriptive Catalogue, Humana Civilitas, vol. 4 (Malibu: Udena Publications, 1978), pp 151–155.
- Neil Krishan Aggarwal, Muhammad Akbar Arzānī (–1772): Mughal physician and translator, J Med Biogr May 2012 20:65—68.
