= Muhammad Aqa-Kermani =

Iranian-Ukrainian scientist

Muhammad Aqa-Kermani (Persian: محمد آغاكرمانى), also written Aqkirmani, was an 18th-century Persian physician from Kerman, Iran.

Little is known of Muhammad Aqkirmani's life except that he was active around the year 1747. He is known by an encyclopedia that is preserved today, as well as three other treatises, all of a lexicographical or encyclopedic nature.

For his compositions, other than the medical one mentioned above, see:

- Carl Brockelmann, Geschichte der arabischen Litteratur, 1st edition, 2 vols. (Leiden: Brill, 1889–1936). Second edition, 2 vols. (Leiden: Brill, 1943–49). Page references will be to those of the first edition, with the 2nd edition page numbers given in parentheses. vol. 2, p. 454 (604).
- Carl Brockelmann, Geschichte der arabischen Litteratur, Supplement, 3 vols. (Leiden: Brill, 1937–1942). vol. 2, p. 674 no. 7.

== See also ==
- List of Iranian scientists
