= Maqsud-Ali Tabrizi =

Iranian physician

Maqsud Ali Tabrizi was a 17th-century Iranian physician in Mughal India.

As indicated by his nisba, he was from Tabriz. He was a translator who worked at the request of the Mughal emperor Jahangir (who ruled 1605–1627 CE).

He translated Arabic treatises into Persian, including the Arabic treatise on the lives and sayings of 34 pre-Islamic and 77 post-Islamic scholars and physicians, that were composed by al-Shahrazuri in 1282 CE.

The National Library of Medicine has a copy of Maqsud Ali Tabrizi's Persian translation of this biographical dictionary which states that he began translating al-Shahrazuri's treatise in 1602CE, though other sources state that he undertook the translation in 1605CE at the request of Jahangir.

According to some biographical sources, Tabrizi was a Sufi scholar who nonetheless became an influential figure at the court of the governor of Gujarat, whom he served many years before enemies intrigued against him and he was imprisoned in the fortress of Gwalior.

== See also ==
- List of Iranian scientists

== Sources ==
For his life and writings, see:

- C.A. Storey, Persian Literature, a Bio-Bibliographical Survey. Volume I, Part 2: Biography, Additions and Corrections (London: Luzac, 1953), p. 1108
- Fateme Keshavarz, A Descriptive and Analytical Catalogue of Persian Manuscripts in the Library of the Wellcome Institute for the History of Medicine (London: Wellcome Institute for the History of Medicine, 1986), pp 542–3 no 368
