= Nikpour =

Nikpour is an Iranian surname. Notable people with the name include:

- Javid Nikpour (born 1976), Iranian photographer
- Shima Nikpour (born 1988), Iranian actress
