= Al-Tughra'i =

Physician

- Born: Mu'ayyad al-Din Abu Isma'il al-Husayn ibn Ali ibn Muhammad ibn Abd al-Samad al-Du'ali al-Kināni al-Tughra'i c. 1061; Isfahan, Persia
- Died: c. 1121
- Occupations: Poet, Alchemist, Administrative Secretary
- Writing career
- Language: Arabic
- Notable works: Mafatih al-Rahmah wa-Masabih al-Hikmah, Kitab Haqa'iq al-Istishhad

Mu'ayyad al-Din Abu Isma'il al-Husayn ibn Ali ibn Muhammad ibn Abd al-Samad al-Du'ali al-Kināni al-Tughra'i (Arabic: العميد فخر الكتاب مؤيد الدين أبو إسماعيل الحسين بن علي بن محمد بن عبد الصمد الدؤلي الكناني الطغرائي) (1061 – c. 1121) was an Arabic poet and alchemist.

== Biography ==
Mu'ayyad al-Din al-Tughra'i was born in Isfahan, Persia, and composed poems in the Arabic language. He was an administrative secretary, whence the name Tughra'i'. He ultimately became the second-most-senior official (after the vizier) in the civil administration of the Seljuq Empire.

Al-Tughra'i had been appointed vizir to Emir Ghiyat-ul-Din Mas'ud, and upon the death of the emir a power struggle ensued between Mas'ud's sons. Al-Tughra'i sided with the emir's elder son, but the younger prevailed. In retribution, the younger son accused al-Tughra'i of heresy and had him beheaded.

== Writings ==
Al-Tughra'i was a well-known and prolific writer on astrology and alchemy, and many of his poems (diwan) are preserved today as well. In the field of alchemy, al-Tughra'i is best known for his large compendium titled Mafatih al-rahmah wa-masabih al-hikmah, which incorporated extensive extracts from earlier Arabic alchemical writings, as well as Arabic translations from Zosimos of Panopolis's old alchemy treatises written in Greek, which were until 1995 erroneously attributed to unknown alchemists by mistakes and inconsistencies in the transliteration and transcription of his name into Arabic.

In 1112 CE, al-Tughra'i also composed Kitab Haqa'iq al-istishhad, a rebuttal of a refutation of the occult in alchemy written by Ibn Sina.

== See also ==
- List of Iranian scientists
- List of Muslim scientists

== Sources ==
- Peacock, A.C.S. (2013). "'Imad al-Din al-Isfahani's Nusrat al-fatra, Seljuq politics and Ayyubid origins". In Hillenbrand, Robert; Peacock, A. C. S.; Abdullaeva, Firuza (eds.). Ferdowsi, the Mongols and the History of Iran: Art, Literature and Culture from Early Islam to Qajar Persia. I.B. Tauris.
- El Khadem, H. S. (1996). "A Translation of a Zosimos' Text in an Arabic Alchemy Book" (PDF). Journal of the Washington Academy of Sciences. 84 (3): 168–178. Archived from the original (PDF) on 2007-09-27.
- Donzel, E. J. van (1994). Islamic Desk Reference. BRILL. p. 457. ISBN 978-90-04-09738-4.
