= Qumri =

Abu Mansur al-Hasan ibn Nuh al-Qumri
- ابو منصور حسن بن نوح قمری
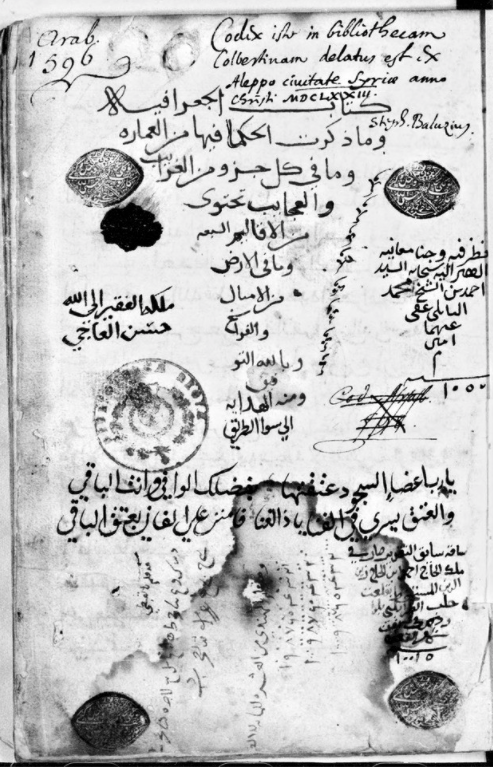
- Colophon from MS Arabe 2220, Bibliothèque nationale de France
- Born: Unknown
- Died: c. 980–990; Bukhara

Philosophical work
- Era: Islamic golden age
- Main interests: Medicine
- Notable works: Ghina Wa Muna ("Book of Wealth and Wishes"); al-Tanwir

Abu Mansur al-Hasan ibn Nuh al-Qumri (Persian: ابو منصور حسن بن نوح قمری) (also transliterated as “al-Qamari” and "al-Qumri") (fl. mid-10th century, died between 980 and 990) was a Persian court physician to the Samanid Prince al-Mansur, and was based in the city of Bukhara. Qumri is theorized to be Avicenna’s teacher.

== Life ==
Little is known about al-Qumri’s life, however the thirteenth century biographer Ibn Abi Usaibia writes in History of the Physicians:

Abū Mansūr al-Hasan ibn Nūh al-Qamarī was the leading personage of his generation, celebrated as a fine physician who had praiseworthy methods and a thorough and wide knowledge of medical theory. He had, may God bless him, a good hand in treatment and was held in great esteem by the kings of his times. The Shaikh and Imam Shams al-Dīn `Abd al-Hamīd ibn `Isā from Khusroshah told me that the Grand Master Ibn Sīna had met this physician when he was very old. He used to attend his council and lessons and benefited from his medical knowledge. Abū Mansūr al-Hasan ibn Nūh al-Qamarī wrote the following books:

1) Wealth and Fate, a fine compendium in which he summarized all the maladies and their treatments in the most perfect and concise way.

2) A collection of citations from the works of those who practiced medicine, especially al-Rāzī.

3) The Causes of Maladies.

Usaibia’s brief biography suggests that Avicenna would have directly attended lectures from al-Qumri, but upon comparing birth and death dates of the two, it seems that Avicenna may have heavily consulted his works in Bukhara.

== Works ==
There are currently three known works attributed to Qumri, and one is presumed to be missing. It is theorized that he may have written more, but if he did these works are lost.

The Ghina Wa Muna, loosely translated as the “Book of Wealth and Wishes” is mentioned in Usaibia's biography. This work has approximately 220 folios and is divided in to three parts; “diseases from head to toe”, “external medicine”, and fevers/pharmacological recipes”. Ghina Was Muna is arranged in a formulaic manner suggesting that this manual would be used as a reference tool while working in the field rather than a theoretical work. Approximately 44 extant copies survive many of them are well preserved suggesting that many of them were library copies, with any working copies too far degraded to survive.

Many of the Ghina Wa Muna manuscripts are either not digitized or accessible in online catalogue entries. The chart below is a selection of digitized or accessible manuscripts:

Location	Shelfmark	Imaging	Noted by
National Library of Medicine	MS A 11	Yes, partial photographs.	Sezgin
Wellcome Library	WMS Arabic 238	Yes, full digital	n/a
Bibliothèque Nationale	Arabe 2220	Yes, scanned microfilm	Karmi

The al-Tanwir fi al-Istiliahat al-Tibbiyya (or al-Tanwir is translated as “Book of Illumination Regarding Medical Technical Terminology”) is a short book on medical terms and tools. This book is presumably designed to be a working reference book and is much shorter than the Ghina Wa Muna. There are approximately 14 extant manuscripts, and at least one critical edition. Like the Ghina Wa Muna, the al-Tanwir’s manuscripts are difficult to access online, and unfortunately a similar chart could not be made.

The Causes of Maladies is presumed missing.

== See also ==
- List of Iranian scientists
- Avicenna
- Ibn Abi Usaibia
- Islamic Golden Age
- Medicine in the medieval Islamic world
