= Hakim-e-Gilani =

Persian physician

Hakim Ali ibn Kamal al-Din Muhammad Gilani (Persian: حكيم علی بن كمال الدين محمد گيلانی) was a 16th-century physician in Mughal India. As indicated by his nisba, he was from Gilan and came from Persia to the Mughal court of Akbar and served under several Mughal rulers in northwest India. He is particularly known for his commentary on The Canon of Medicine by Avicenna.

Hakim Ali Gilani died on 5 Muharram 1018AH / 1609.

== See also ==
- List of Iranian scientists
