= Abu Zayn Kahhal =

Abu Zayn Kahhal (Persian: ابو زین کحال) was a 15th-century Persian physician. Not much is known about his life. He lived during the era of Timurid Shahrukh and went to Herat during his reign. His name, Kahhal means "oculist". He is the author of a medieval medical text named "Sharayet-i Jarrahi" (Persian: شرایط جراحی; "Surgical Requirements") which he dedicated to Shahrukh. The book is preserved in three incomplete manuscripts, and no other Persian work on medicine quoted this book.
