= Al-Natili =

Persian physician

Natili. Abu Abdallah Husayn ibn Ibrahim ibn Hasan ibn Khurshid at-Tabari an-Natili (Persian: ابوعبدالله حسین بن حسن بن خُرشید طبری ناتلی | Romanization: Abū ʿAbdallāh Ḥusain ibn Ibrāhīm ibn Khūrshīd aṭ-Ṭabarī an-Nātllī), was a Persian physician from Tabaristan.

He is most famous for being the tutor of the influential polymath Ibn Sina. Later, Ibn Sina was largely dismissive of Natili's influence but acknowledged that his interest in medicine arose in the course of his studies with him. As Ibn Sina was largely dismissive of most contemporaries, such as Al Biruni, Abu ‘l- Faraj, and more, this actually speaks to the level of respect Natili must have commanded.

He flourished in the 10th century, and was a translator of Greek into Arabic. He dedicated, in 990-991AD, an improved translation of Dioscorides' De Materia Medica to the Prince Abu Ali al-Samjuri. Ibn Sina later included large sections of it in the fourth book of The Canon of Medicine, which was the authoritative source of medieval medicine for centuries.

== Sources ==
- Carl Brockelmann: Arabische Litteratur (189, 207).
- S. Frederick Starr: Lost Enlightenment: Central Asia's Golden Age from the Arab Conquest to Tamerlane (256-265)

== See also ==
- List of Iranian scientists
