= Amoli, Almora =

Amoli
- Village
- Location within India
- Coordinates: 30.305265°N 78.098333°E
- Country: India
- State: Uttarakhand
- District: Almora
- Tehsil: Bhikia Sain

Population
  - Total: 227
- Time zone: UTC+5:30 (Indian Standard Time)
- ISO 3166 code: IN-UT

Amoli is a village in India, found within the Bhikia Sain Tehsil (block), in Almora district of Kumaon division in Uttarakhand state. It lies near the Raksheshwar Mahadev temple and VINAYAK degree collage
