= Muhammad ibn Yusuf al-Harawi =

Persian physician

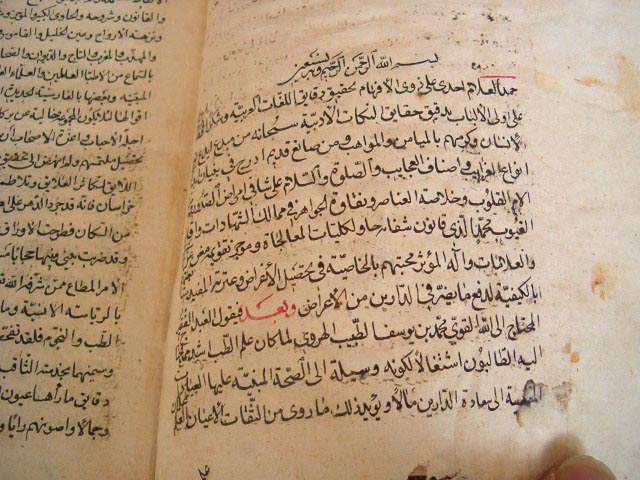
Bahr al-Jawahir, a manuscript copied in 1758

Muhammad ibn Yusuf al-Harawi (Persian: محمد بن یوسف هروی, fl. 1492-1518 and died 1542) was a Persian late 15th century physician from Herat, Safavid Iran, now part of Afghanistan.

In 1518 he composed, in Arabic, an alphabetical medical dictionary and encyclopedia. It covers anatomical and pathological terms and concepts, medicinal substances, and prominent physicians, with all the entries arranged alphabetically. This medical lexicon, titled 'Jawahir al-lughah wa-Bahr al-jawahir', has three chapters: the first explaining terminology for parts of the body (in alphabetical order), the second on the names of simple and compound drugs (also in alphabetical order), and the third on names of diseases, presented in order from head to toe according to their locations. An autograph copy of Jawahir al-lughah exists in which the author states that he completed the correction of the treatise in 1492 (London, Wellcome Library for the History and Understanding of Medicine, MS Arab. 143).

His other work, “Ainul Hayat” is based on Ageing. The original manuscript of Ainul Hayat was written in 1532 by the author in Herat. There are four copies of this old manuscript reported in various libraries of the world. It is stated that this is the first text on ageing in the world. After collation of these four copies of the manuscript, Hakim Syed Zillur Rahman edited and translated the manuscript in 2007. In the edited book, one can find how the author 500 years back discussed all types of behavioral and lifestyle factors including diet, environment and housing conditions related to ageing. He also discussed what drugs could increase and decrease ageing.

== See also ==
- List of Iranian scientists
