= Al-Shahrazuri =

13th-century Kurdish physician and philosopher

Shams al-Din Muhammad Mahmud Shahrazuri (Kurdish: شەمسەددین محەممەد مەحموود شارەزووری) knowns as Shahrazuri (Kurdish: شارەزووری) was a 13th-century Muslim physician, historian and philosopher. He was of Kurdish origin. It appears that he was alive in AD 1288. However, it is also said that he died in the same year.

Shahrazuri was an important historian and scholar of the late 13th century who composed a biographical dictionary of both ancient Greek and early Muslim learned men. Although he wrote a major biographical work on scholars, very little is known about his life, including the dates of his birth and death. Perhaps the most well known work by him is Nuzhat al arwâḥ wa rawḍat al-afrâḥ. According to the correction and reprint by M A Khurshid, there are several copies of the book; one of them in the John Rylands library in Manchester.

Edward Granville Browne mentions two medical works attributed to him, one in Arabic and another in Persian language.(E. Browne, p. 100) One of his philosophical works is commentary about philosopher Suhrawardi called Sharḥ Ḥikma al-ishrâq. It is also said that the well known commentary works of Qutb al-Din Al Shirazi called Durrat al-Taj about Suhrawardi's Hikmat al-Ishraq is based on Sharḥ Ḥikma al-ishrâq. It is also said that another of his work regarding Suhrawardi's Illumnationist philosophy is the most faithful, called al-Shajarah al-Ilahiyyah (The Divine Tree).

== See also ==
- List of Kurdish philosophers

== Sources ==
For his life and writings, see:

- P. Lory, "Shahrazuri" in The Encyclopaedia of Islam, 2nd edition, ed. by H.A.R. Gibbs, B. Lewis, Ch. Pellat, C. Bosworth et al., 11 vols. (Leiden: E.J. Brill, 1960-2002), vol. 9, p. 219
- Manfred Ullmann, Die Medizin im Islam, Handbuch der Orientalistik, Abteilung I, Erg?nzungsband vi, Abschnitt 1 (Leiden: E.J. Brill, 1970), p. 232
- Carl Brockelmann, Geschichte der arabischen Litteratur, Supplement, 3 vols. (Leiden: Brill, 1937-1942) vol. 1, pp 850–1
- Sami Hamarneh, "Arabic Historiography as Related to the Health Professions in Medieval Islam", Sudhoffs Archiv, vol. 50 (1966), pp 2–24, esp. pp 17–18.
- Edward Granville Browne, Islamic Medicine, 2002, Goodword Pub., ISBN 81-87570-19-9
- Michael Privot, Le Kitâb al-rumûz d'al-Shahrazûrî: une oeuvre ishrâqî? (PhD Thesis)
