= Muhammad ibn Mahmud Amuli =

Medieval Persian physician from Amol, Iran

Muhammad ibn Mahmud al-Amuli Persian: شمس الدین محمد بن محمود آملی was a medieval Persian physician from Amol, Iran.

He wrote an Arabic commentary on the epitome of Avicenna's The Canon of Medicine that had been made by Yusuf al-Ilaqi.

Between 1335 and 1342, Amoli also composed a large and widely read Persian encyclopedia on the classification of knowledge titled (Nafa'is al-funun fi ‘ara'is al-‘uyun).

== See also ==
- List of Iranian scientists

== Sources ==
- A.Z. Iskandar, A Catalogue of Arabic Manuscripts on Medicine and Science in the Wellcome Historical Medical Library (London: The Wellcome Historical Medical Library, 1967), p. 37, note 11.
- E. Sachau and H. Ethé, Catalogue of the Persian, Turkish, Hindûstânî and Pushtû Manuscripts in the Bodleian Library. Part 1: The Persian Manuscripts (Oxford: Clarendon Press, 1889), col. 909.

For his writings, see:

- A.Z. Iskandar, A Catalogue of Arabic Manuscripts on Medicine and Science in the Wellcome Historical Medical Library (London: The Wellcome Historical Medical Library, 1967), p. 52 note 3.
- Carl Brockelmann, Geschichte der arabischen Litteratur, 1st edition, 2 vols. (Leiden: Brill, 1889–1936). Second edition, 2 vols. (Leiden: Brill, 1943–49). Page references will be to those of the first edition, with the 2nd edition page numbers given in parentheses, vol. 1, p. 457 (597).
- Carl Brockelmann, Geschichte der arabischen Litteratur, Supplement, 3 vols. (Leiden: Brill, 1937–1942), p. 824.
- Fateme Keshavarz, A Descriptive and Analytical Catalogue of Persian Manuscripts in the Library of the Wellcome Institute for the History of Medicine (London: Wellcome Institute for the History of Medicine, 1986), p. 539.
