= Al-Nagawri =

Persian physician

Shahab al-Din ibn ‘Abd al-Karim Qivam al-Nagawri was a 14th-century Persian physician.

Shihab al-Din al-Nagawri composed several medical treatises, including a general handbook composed in 1392 and a short dictionary of drugs. His metrical Persian compendium on therapeutics was written in 1388 and was often known as "Shahab's Medicine" as well as the more formal title Shifa' al-maradh ("The Healing of Disease"). Much of the autobiographical material is contained in this didactic poem, including that al-Nagawri made his living in trade rather than as a physician.

== See also ==
- List of Iranian scientists
