= Abu ul-Ala Shirazi =

- Died: 1001
- Known for: treatment of malaria
- Scientific career
- Fields: medicine

Abu ul-Ala Shirazi (died 1001) lived around the 10th century at the court of the Buyid emir 'Adud al-Dawla. He found that arsenic could cure malaria.
