= Abu al-Qasim Muqane'i =

Persian physician

Tahir ibn Mohammad ibn Ibrahim (Bokhari) or Abu al-Qasim Muqane'i was a Persian physician in the 10th century. He was the disciple of Rhazes. Abu Bakr Rabee Ibn Ahmad Al-Akhawyni Bokhari cited him in his book Hidayat al-Muta`allemin Fi al-Tibb as "Master":

What I'm saying here is from my master Abu al-Qasim Muqane'i whose name is Tahir and he was disciple of Al-razi
