= Tunakabuni =

Persian physician

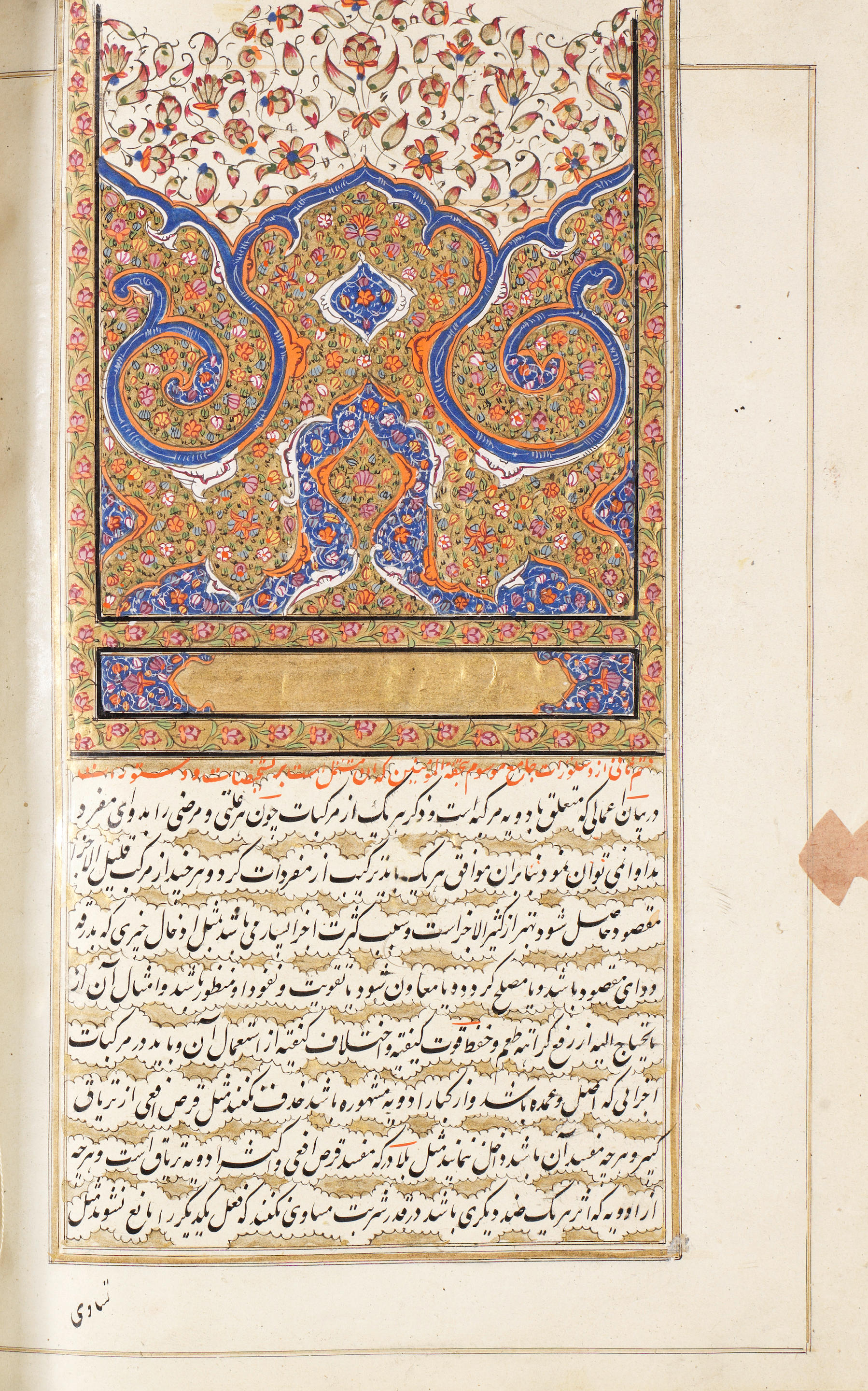
Qajar-era copy of Tonekaboni's Tuhfat al-mu'minin, given as waqf to the town of Tabas Gilaki (now Tabas) by Amir 'Ali Naqi Khan, son of Mohammad Hasan Khan. Waqf dedication dated August–September 1824, copied before 1819-20

Muḥammad Mu’min ibn Mīr Muḥammad Zamān Tunakābunī (Persian: محمد مؤمن بن میر محمد زمان تنکابنی) was a 17th-century Persian physician from Mazandaran.

Tunakabuni was an author on various medical and religious topics. He based his large Persian compendium of simple and compound remedies, which according to the text was composed in 1679, on Arabic authorities and on Indian sources. His treatise was dedicated to Shah Sulayman, who ruled from 1666 to 1694. Grandfathers of him emigrated from Tonekabon to Isfahan and were special healers of the kings of the Safavid dynasty. Tunakabuni was also the special doctor of King Soleiman and had skill in medicine and language. He wrote his famous book, Tohfat AL-mo'menin, for king Soleiman.

== See also ==
- List of Iranian scientists

== Sources ==
For his medical writings, see:

- C.A. Storey, Persian Literature: A Bio-Bibliographical Survey. Volume II, Part 2: E.Medicine (London: Royal Asiatic Society, 1971), p. 261-3 no. 448
- Lutz Richter-Bernburg, Persian Medical Manuscripts at the University of California, Los Angeles: A Descriptive Catalogue, Humana Civilitas, vol. 4 (Malibu: Udena Publications, 1978), pp. 128–31
- Fateme Keshavarz, A Descriptive and Analytical Catalogue of Persian Manuscripts in the Library of the Wellcome Institute for the History of Medicine (London: Wellcome Institute for the History of Medicine, 1986) p. 268
- A.Z. Iskandar, A Descriptive List of Arabic Manuscripts on Medicine and Science at the University of California, Los Angeles (Leiden: Brill, 1984). p. 36.
