= Qurayshi al-Shirazi =

Iranian physician

Nur al-Din Muhammad Abd-Allah ibn Hakim ‘Ayn al-Mulk Qurayshi Shirazi was a mid 17th century Persian physician in Mughal India.

As indicated by his nisba, he was from Shiraz, Iran. He is best known for his large synopsis of "Yunani" or Unani medicine (Greco-Roman medicine as inherited by Islam) and Hindu medicine (Ayurveda) that was entitled Zakhira-i Dara-Shukuhi and dedicated to the Mughal emperor Shah Jahan's son Dara Shikuh, who ruled as emperor from 1657-9CE.

He also composed in 1628 CE a Persian pharmacological dictionary titled Alfaz al-adwiyah which he had dedicated to Shah Jahan himself, of which the National Library of Medicine has a copy.

== See also ==
- List of Iranian scientists

== Sources ==
- C.A. Storey, Persian Literature: A Bio-Bibliographical Survey. Volume II, Part 2: E. Medicine (London: Royal Asiatic Society, 1971), pp 255–8 no 439
- Fateme Keshavarz, A Descriptive and Analytical Catalogue of Persian Manuscripts in the Library of the Wellcome Institute for the History of Medicine (London: Wellcome Institute for the History of Medicine, 1986), pp 78–80, no 4.
