= Al-Wabkanawi =

Persian astronomer

Shams al-Munajjim Muhammad ibn Ali al-Wabkanawi was a 14th century Persian astronomer. He is the author of a zij, the al-Zīj al-muḥaqqaq. From his name it is known he originated from Wābkana, Bukhara, but little else is known of his life. His zij is extant in four manuscripts. His book is written in Persian, even though its title is in Arabic. Another extant book by him, Kitāb-i maʿrifat-i usṭurlāb-i shamālī is also written in Persian.

== Sources ==
- Hockey, Thomas; et al., eds. (2007). "Wābkanawī: Shams al-Munajjim [Shams al-Dīn] Muḥammad ibn ҁAlī Khwāja al-Wābkanawī [Wābkanawī]". The Biographical Encyclopedia of Astronomers. Springer. pp. 1187–1188. doi:10.1007/978-0-387-30400-7_1433. ISBN 978-1-4419-9918-4.
