= Nurbakhshi =

Persian physician

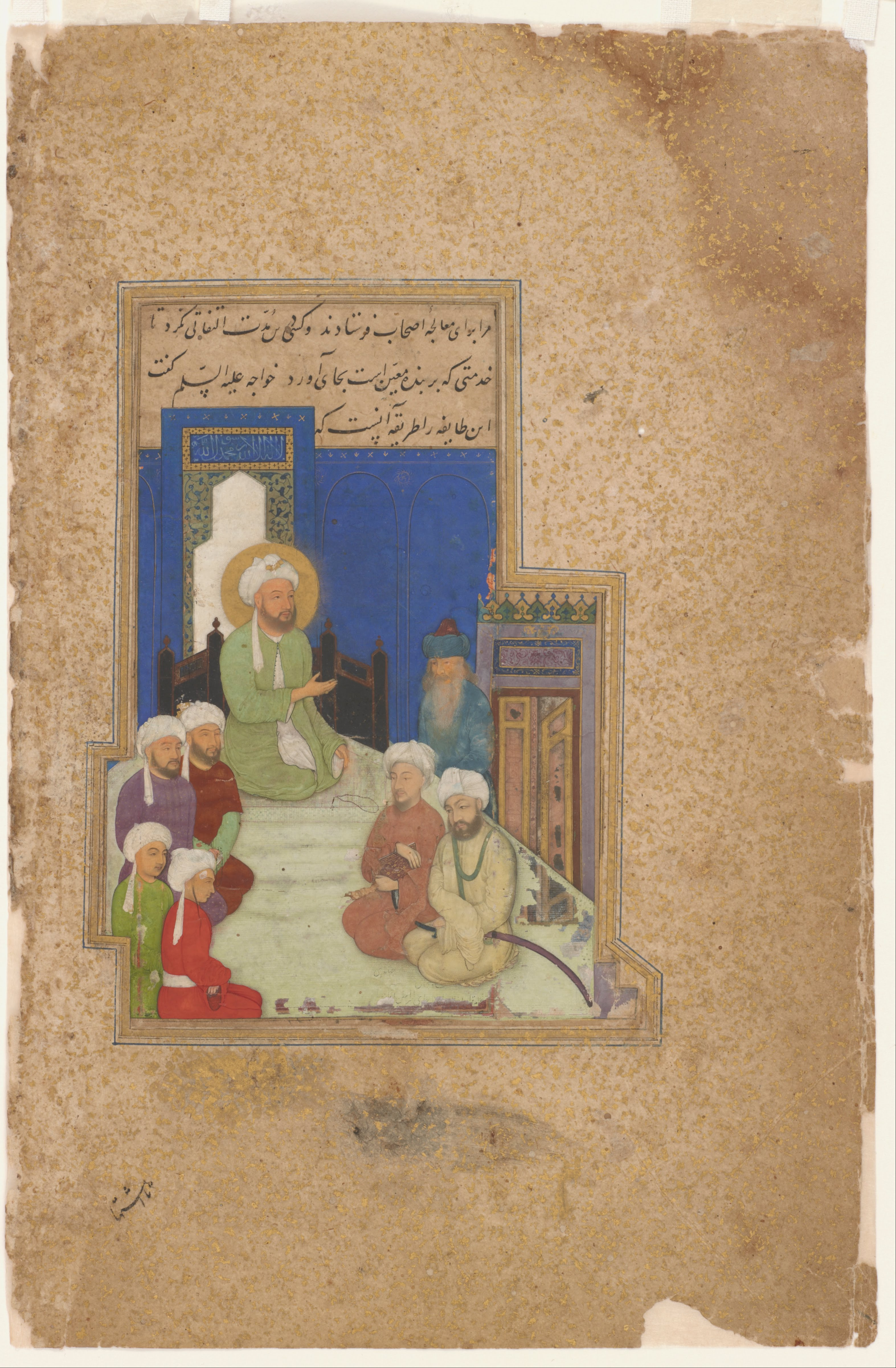
The Prophet and the Persian physician, miniature by ‛Abid. Mughal India, ca. 1645. Freer Gallery of Art

Baha' al-Dawlah ibn Siraj al-Din Shah Qasim ibn Muhammad al-Husayni Nurbakhshi (also sometimes called Nuri rather than Nurbakhshi), was a 15–16th century Persian physician.

He obtained court favor in both Persia and Baghdad. He is known for one treatise, a medical compendium called Khulasat al-tajarib (The Summary of Experience) which he composed in 1501 in the village of Tarasht, which was near the town of Ray, present-day Tehran.

== See also ==
- List of Iranian scientists

== Sources ==
For evidence regarding his life and probable date of death, see:

- Lutz Richter-Bernburg, Persian Medical Manuscripts at the University of California, Los Angeles: A Descriptive Catalogue, Humana Civilitas, vol. 4 (Malibu: Udena Publications, 1978), pp 62–64
- C.A. Storey, Persian Literature: A Bio-Bibliographical Survey. Volume II, Part 2: E. Medicine (London: Royal Asiatic Society, 1971), pp 230–231.
