= Javid Nikpour =

Iranian photographer (born 1976)

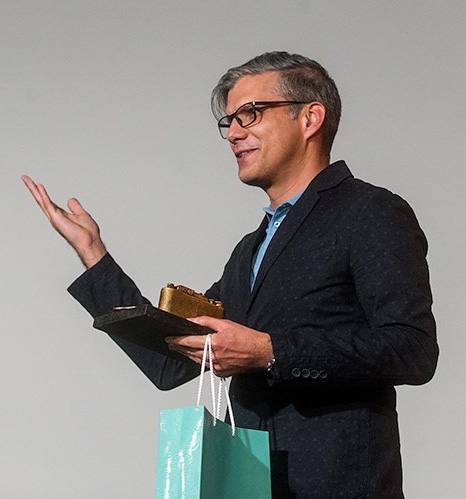
- Born: 1976 (age 49–50); Tehran, Iran
- Occupation: Photojournalist
- Years active: 1999 - present
- Website: www.javidnikpour.com

Javid Nikpour (born 1976) is an Iranian photojournalist and sports photographer.

He was photo manager of Iranian photographers in Four Olympic Games (Beijing, London, Rio and Tokyo) and Four Asian Games (Doha, Guangzhou, Incheon and Indonesia).

In 2015, Nikpour won first and third place in the Istanbul Photo Awards, and in 2016, he was one of the winners of the Award of Excellence in Pictures of the Year International. He won the Grand Prix of Paris Sport Photo in 2019.

== Life and work ==
In 2015, he received an Art first-grade diploma in photography (Equivalent degree of PhD) from the Ministry of Culture and Islamic Guidance. He founded Podium Photos in 2016.

== Awards ==
- 2016: Award of Excellence in 73rd Pictures of the Year International (POYi) winners
- 2019: Grand Prix and 1 st place of the Paris Sport Photo Festival
