= Shapur ibn Sahl =

Persian physician

Sābūr ibn Sahl (شاپور بن سهل گندیشاپوری; d. 869 CE) was a 9th-century Persian Christian physician from the Academy of Gundishapur.

Among other medical works, he wrote one of the first medical books on antidotes called Aqrabadhin (القراباذين), which was divided into 22 volumes, and which was possibly the earliest of its kind to influence Islamic medicine. This antidotary enjoyed much popularity until it was superseded Ibn al-Tilmidh's version later in the first half of twelfth century.

== See also ==
- List of Iranian scientists
