= Abu al-'Uqul =

Astronomer in Taiz, Yemen

Abū al-ʿUqūl

Academic background
- Influences: Ibn Yunus, Muḥammad ibn Abī Bakr al-Fārisī

Academic work
- Main interests: Astronomy
- Notable works: Mirʾāt al-zamān

Abū al-ʿUqūl Muḥammad ibn Aḥmad al-Ṭabarī (flourished in Yemen during the 14th century) was a leading astronomer in Taiz and the first teacher of astronomy at the Muʾayyadiyya Madrasa. Of Iranian origin, he is known for compiling the largest single corpus of tables for astronomical timekeeping in a specific latitude during medieval times, with over 100,000 entries. Another interesting feature of his work was determining the latitude of Taiz as 13° 37' (where the actual is 13° 35').

== Life ==
His epithet al-Tabarī suggests that he or his family stemmed from Tabaristan, a region in northern Iran. He lived in Yemen during the time of the Rasulid Sultan al-Ashraf Umar II and was contemporary to another famous astronomer Muḥammad ibn Abī Bakr al-Fārisī.

== Works ==
- Al-Zīj al-mukhtār min al-azyāj a compilation of different books of zij that is based heavily on the Ḥākimī Zīj of Ibn Yunus. Some of his original additions were astronomical tables specific to Yemen.
- Mirʾāt al-zamān (lit. "Mirror of the Time"), a large corpus of tables for astronomical timekeeping computed for Taiz at latitude 13° 37' and obliquity 23° 35', including tables of the hour angle and the time since sunrise. It also contains tables of the solar altitude and longitude and the altitude of various other fixed stars. His altitude tables are similar to those used in Iraq or Iran, rather than ones found in Egypt. His tables are extant in copies found in Mokha in 1795.
- An almanac linking agricultural features to astronomical events.
