= Najib ad-Din Samarqandi =

Persian physician

Najib ad-Din Abu Hamid Muhammad ibn Ali ibn Umar Samarqandi (Arabic: نجيب الدين أبو حامد محمد بن علي بن عمر السمرقندي, ALA-LC: Najīb al-Dīn Abū Ḥāmid Muḥammad ibn ʿAlī ibn ʿUmar al-Samarqandī) was a 13th-century Persian physician from Samarqand.

Samarqandi died during the Mongol attack on Herat, in Afghanistan, in 1222CE. He was a prolific medical writer and expositor of medical ideas, though few details are known of his life.

His most famous book was The Book of Causes and Symptoms, a comprehensive manual of therapeutics and pathology. The treatises were widely read and often commentaries were written on them.

== See also ==
- List of Iranian scientists

== Sources ==
For his life and writings, see:

- A. Z. Iskandar, "A Study of al-Samarqandi's Medical Writings", Le Muséon, vol. 85 (1972), pp 451–479; DSB vol. 12, pp 90–91.
- Manfred Ullmann, Die Medizin im Islam, Handbuch der Orientalistik, Abteilung I, Ergänzungsband vi, Abschnitt 1 (Leiden: E.J. Brill, 1970), p. 170.
- Juliane Müller, Nahrungsmittel in der arabischen Medizin Das Kitāb al-Aġḏiya wa-l-ašriba des Naǧīb ad-Dīn as-Samarqandī. Brill, 2017. Critical edition and German translation.
