= Hakim Ghulam Imam =

Persian physician

Hakim Ghulam Imam (Persian: حکیم غلام امام) was a Persian physician, whose dates are uncertain.

He composed a Persian-language treatise on therapeutics titled Ilaj al-ghuraba ("The Treatment of Rare Conditions"), which is preserved today in only one recorded manuscript, now in India, but which was also printed in India many times in the 19th century.

Nothing is known of the author, though The National Library of Medicine database places him to be active in India before the 19th century.

== Sources ==
For copies and printings of his treatise, see:

- C.A. Storey, Persian Literature: A Bio-Bibliographical Survey. Volume II, Part 2: E.Medicine (London: Royal Asiatic Society, 1971), p. 318, no. 70

== See also ==
- List of Iranian scientists
