= Al-Khurasani al-Shirazi =

Persian physician

Muhammad Hussayn ibn Muhammad Hadi al-‘Aqili al-‘Alavi al-Khurasani al-Shirazi (Persian: محمدحسين بن محمدهادی عقيلی علوی خراسانی شیرازی) was a Persian physician from the 18th century from Shiraz.

Muhammad Husayn ibn Muhammad Hadi, known as Hakim Muhammad Hadikhan, is mostly known for two Persian compendia on simple and compound remedies: Majma‘ al-javami‘ va-zakha'ir al-tarakib, which he composed in 1771 and based largely upon a treatise titled Jami‘ al-javami‘ by his great-uncle Alavi Shirazi, and the Makhzan al-adviyah which is a verbatim reproduction of the alphabetical pharmacopeia in the Jami‘ al-javami‘ of his great-uncle.

Muhammad Hadikhan also composed a number of smaller medical treatises, among them a treatise on smallpox.

== See also ==
- List of Iranian scientists
