= Rostam Gorgani =

Iranian physician

Rostam Gorgani was a mid-16th century Persian physician who lived in India.

Rostam Gorgani was the court physician of two of the rulers of the Deccan sultanates, Malik Ahmad Shah I (1490–1510) and Burhan Shah I (1510–1553), in the city of Ahmadnagar in the Deccan Plateau, India. His name indicates he was from Gorgan, Golestan, Iran.

He composed several medical treatises in Persian, the most extensive being the Zakhirai-Nizamshahi (Supplies of Nizamshah), his encyclopaedia of material medica which he compiled at the request of Sultan Nizam-Shah and named after him. Only two copies survive, one at the Manuscript Institute of the National Academy of Sciences of Azerbaijan, and the other at the National Library of Medicine of the United States.

== See also ==
- List of Iranian scientists
