= Abu 'Ubayd al-Juzjani =

Persian physician and chronicler from Guzgan

Abū 'Ubayd al-Jūzjānī (died 1070) (ابو عبيد جوزجانی) was a Muslim physician and chronicler from Guzgan (modern day Uzbekistan).

He was a pupil of Avicenna, whom he first met in Gorgan. He spent many years with his master in Isfahan, becoming his lifetime companion. After Avicenna's death, he completed Avicenna's Autobiography with a concluding section.

The historian Ibn Abi Usaibia describes Avicenna and his close companion Abu Ubayd living together the residence of Sheikh al-Raiss (which is the title given to Avicenna) and spent each night studying one of the Canon and Shifā's instructions.

== See also ==
- List of Iranian scientists
