= Mahmud ibn Ilyas Shirazi =

Persian physician

Mahmud ibn Ilyas Shirazi was an authoritative Persian physician who lived before the 18th century and was from Shiraz.

All that is known of this figure is that he is cited as an authority by ‘Ali ibn Shaykh Muhammad ibn ‘Abd al-Rahman who composed a versified Persian medical compendium titled Jawahir al-maqal, a copy of which is preserved at The National Library of Medicine.

Since ‘Ali ibn Shaykh Muhammad ibn ‘Abd al-Rahman died possibly in 1700, then we can conclude that Mahmud ibn Ilyas Shirazi lived sometime before that date.

== See also ==
- List of Iranian scientists
- Islamic medicine

== Sources ==
- E. Sachau and H. Ethé, Catalogue of the Persian, Turkish, Hindustani, and Pushtu Manuscripts in the Bodleian Library (Oxford: Clarendon Press, 1889), col. 969 entry 1609.
