= Qiwam al-Din Muhammad al-Hasani =

Persian physician

Qiwam al-Din Muhammad al-Hasani was a Persian physician of the late 17th century. Hasani was a scholar who is known to have been working in the city of Qazvin in Persia in the year 1694 CE. The National Library of Medicine has in its collections a rare copy of a collection of five Arabic poems concerned with medicine, astronomy, arithmetic, calligraphy, and proper conduct. These five poems were collectively titled al-Khamsah al-Qazwiniyah (The Five Qazwini works). The copy at NLM was copied by a professional scribe for the author, whose stamps are in the volume, next to a statement that he corrected the volume in the year 1719–1720 CE. Thus we learn from this volume that Qiwan al-Din Muhammad al-Hasani was still working by 1719 CE.

== See also ==
- List of Iranian scientists

== Sources ==
- C. Brockelmann, Geschichte der arabischen Litteratur, Supplement, 3 vols. (Leiden: Brill, 1937–1942), vol. 1 p. 826 and vol. 2 p. 592.
