= Haseb-i Tabari =

Persian astronomer

Abu Ja'far Muhammad ibn Ayyub-i Haseb-i Tabari (Persian: حاسب طبری) was a Persian astronomer. All of his works are in Persian language and none of them are written in Arabic (though some of his works have Arabic titles). Not much is known about his life. His works are among the oldest scientific works in Persian language. He used many Persian equivalents for Arabic words. He was from Amol, Tabaristan.
