= Abu al-Qasim al-Habib Neishapuri =

Persian physician

Abu al-Qasim al-Habib Neishaburi (Persian: ابوالقاسم حبیب نیشابوری) was a Persian physician from Khorasan who lived before 1750CE.

He is known to have written two Arabic treatises on Prophetic medicine. One is in a unique copy now at The National Library of Medicine, copied in 1792CE, and the other is preserved in a unique copy now in Los Angeles that was copied in 1750CE.

== See also ==
- List of Iranian scientists
