= Abubakr Esfarayeni =

Iranian physician

Abd Allah ibn Ahmad ibn Muhammad Asfara'ni, also written Esfarayeni, known as Abu Bakr was a Persian physician from Esfarayen, North Khorasan, Iran.

His treatise, entitled Zubdat al-bayan fi ‘ilm al-abdah ("The Best Explanation in the Science of Bodies"), is preserved in a unique copy now in the collections of The National Library of Medicine. They were active before 1826.

== See also ==
- List of Iranian scientists
