= Sultan Ali Khorasani =

16th century Persian scientist

Sultan Ali Khorasani was a 16th-century Persian physician from Khorasan, Persia.

Sultan-‘Ali usually signed his name as Hakim Sultan-Ali Tabib Khurasani -- that is, doctor Sultan-‘Ali, physician of Khurasan (in Persia).

He practiced medicine for 40 years in Khurasan and in Transoxiana (Central Asia), especially in Samarqand. He began writing his Persian therapeutic manual Dastur al-‘ilaj in the year 1526 at the request of Abu al-Muzaffar Mahmud-Shah Sultan.

Numerous copies of his manual are preserved today.

== Sources ==
For his treaties and the few details of his life, see:

- Fateme Keshavarz, A Descriptive and Analytical Catalogue of Persian Manuscripts in the Library of the Wellcome Institute for the History of Medicine (London: Wellcome Institute for the History of Medicine, 1986), pp. 178–183 no. 56
- C.A. Storey, Persian Literature: A Bio-Bibliographical Survey. Volume II, Part 2: E.Medicine (London: Royal Asiatic Society, 1971), p. 233-234 no. 404.

== See also ==
- List of Iranian scientists
