= Zayn-e-Attar =

Persian physician

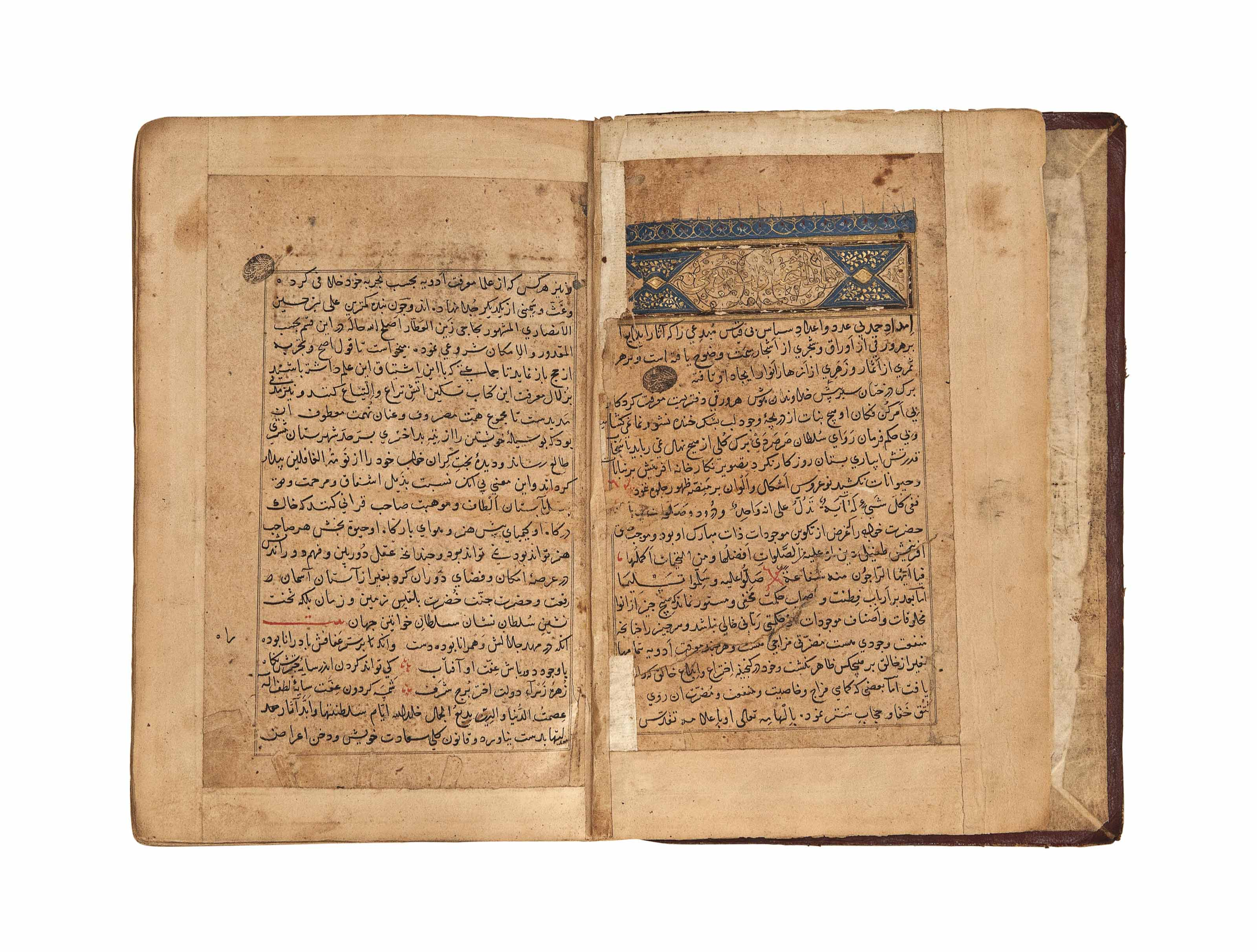
Manuscript of Ali ibn al-Hasan Zayn al-Din 'Attar Ansari Shirazi's Ikhtiyarat Badi'i. Copy created in Timurid Iran, dated 29 July 1444

Haji Zayn Attar (Note: Also known as Haji Zain ol Attar, Ali ibn Hossein Ansari, Haji Zain Sharbat-dar, Attar of Shiraz, Haji Zainu'l 'Attar, Abi b. Al-Husain Al-'Attar, and Haji Zain al Din Ansari) (c. 1329–1403) was a 14th-century Persian physician. He is best known as the author of the Persian language pharmacopoeia Ekhtiyarat i Badi i.

== Biography ==
Attar was born in 1329-1330 CE (730 AH) in Shiraz, and lived during the rule of the Injuids and the Muzaffarids. He was a descendant of the Sufi philosopher Abdullah Ansari. His father Kamal ol Din Hosein Ansari was a well-known physician, and had migrated from Isfahan to Shiraz.

He served for sixteen years as the court physician to the Muzaffarid ruler Shah Shuja (r. 1358–1384).

Attar died at Shiraz in 1403-1404 CE (806-807 AH). He had two sons: Hosein and Ahmad. The elder son Hosein Ansari wrote Sahah ol Adviah or Is-hah ol Adviah' ("The Correction of Medicines"), considered a supplement to his father's book. The book provides correct pronunciation of the drugs listed in his father's book and the author's opinions on specific medical cases. The younger son Ahmad ibn Ali alias Ahmad Ansari wrote multiple books, including Miftah ol Kunuz (on medication); Dastur ol Muteakelin ("Protocol for Gourmets", on sweet food); Tohfat ol muluk ("The Presents of Kings", on intoxicating drinks); Dastur ol Zira-ah ("The Protocol for Agriculture"); and Dastur ol suada ("The Protocol of the Fortunate", on wisdom of sages). A collection of biographies - Fazilat e Elm u Hikmat va Tawarikh e Hukama ("The Virtue of Science and The Philosophy and Biography of Sages") - is also attributed to him; this book is also known as Kitab li-Valad Haji Zain ol Attar ("The Book of Haji Zain ol Attar's son").

== Works ==
Attar wrote Miftah ol Khazain ("Key to the Treasures") in 1365–1366. The book contains three sections, on simple medications, improvements and substitutes, and compound medications.

Attar's most famous work is Ekhtiyarat i Badi i, (Note: Alternative transliterations include Ikhtiyarat-i Badi'i, Ikhtiyarat Badiei, Ikhtiyarati-Badii, and Ikhtiyarat Badi') which he completed in 1368–1369 CE, and dedicated to the Muzaffarid queen Badi ol Jamal. A comprehensive pharmacopoeia of simple and compound remedies, it is probably the most popular Old Persian medical book. Besides the supplement Sahah ol Adviah authored by Attar's son, several other writers wrote derivative works or supplements to Attar's work. Attar's work was the basis of several later Persian pharmacopoeias including Qarabadin Jalali, Tohfat ol Momenin and Makhzan ol Adviah. Jalal ibn Amin al Morshed al Kazerooni expanded and redacted the second part of Attar's book. Hakim Mohammad Ali al Hoseini of Hyderabad wrote a commentary titled Tatmim Ekhtiyarat i Qutb Shahi on Attar's work.

Attar's other works include:

- Tuhfat ol Salatin ("Present of the Sultans"), an anatomical pamphlet
- Tuhfat ol Khavatin or Tohfat al Khavanin ("Present of the Queens")
- Risalah dar Sifat i mardan va zanan ("A Treatise on the Qualities of Men and Women")

== See also ==
- List of Iranian scientists
