= Mohammad Mehdi ibn Ali Naqi =

Iranian doctor

Muhammad Mehdi ibn Ali Naqi (Persian: محمدمهدی بن علی نقی), was an early 18th-century Persian physician from Isfahan.

He composed a Persian treatise on hygiene and preservation of health addressed to travelers, titled Zad al-musafirin, which he wrote in Isfahan, during the Afghan invasion. He completed it on 15 September 1728 CE.

This treatise is preserved today in numerous copies. The copy at The National Library of Medicine, however, is one of only two copies that contain the postscript stating when and where he composed the manual.

== See also ==
- List of Iranian scientists

== Sources ==
For his life and his treatise, see:

- C.A. Storey, Persian Literature: A Bio-Bibliographical Survey. Volume II, Part 2: E. Medicine (London: Royal Asiatic Society, 1971), pp 272–273 no 471
- Lutz Richter-Bernburg, Persian Medical Manuscripts at the University of California, Los Angeles: A Descriptive Catalogue, Humana Civilitas, vol. 4 (Malibu: Udena Publications, 1978), p. 155.
