= Ibn Abi al-Ashʿath =

Persian physician (died 975)

Ibn Abi al-Ashʿath (Arabic: أحمد بن محمد بن محمد بن أبي الأشعث; died 975 CE) was a Persian physician of medieval Islam. He wrote many commentaries on Galen's works.

He died in Mosul, Iraq.

== Physiology ==
Ahmad ibn Abi al-Ash'ath described the physiology of the stomach in a live lion in his book al-Quadi wa al-muqtadi. He wrote:

When food enters the stomach, especially when it is plentiful, the stomach dilates and its layers get stretched...onlookers thought the stomach was rather small, so I proceeded to pour jug after jug in its throat…the inner layer of the distended stomach became as smooth as the external peritoneal layer. I then cut open the stomach and let the water out. The stomach shrank and I could see the pylorus…

Ahmad ibn Abi al-Ash'ath observed the physiology of the stomach in a live lion in 959. This description preceded William Beaumont by almost 900 years, making Ahmad ibn al-Ash'ath the first person to initiate experimental events in gastric physiology.

== Works ==
His works include:

- الأدوية المفردة
- الحيوان
- العلم الالهي
- الجدري و الحصبة و الحميقاء
- السرسام و البرسام و مداواتهما
- القولونج و أسبابه و مداواته
- البرص و البهق
- الصريح
- الاستسقاء
- ظهور الدم
- الماليخوليا
- تركيب الأدوية
- أمراض المعدة و مداواتها
