= Heinrich Suter =

Swiss historian (1848 – 1922)

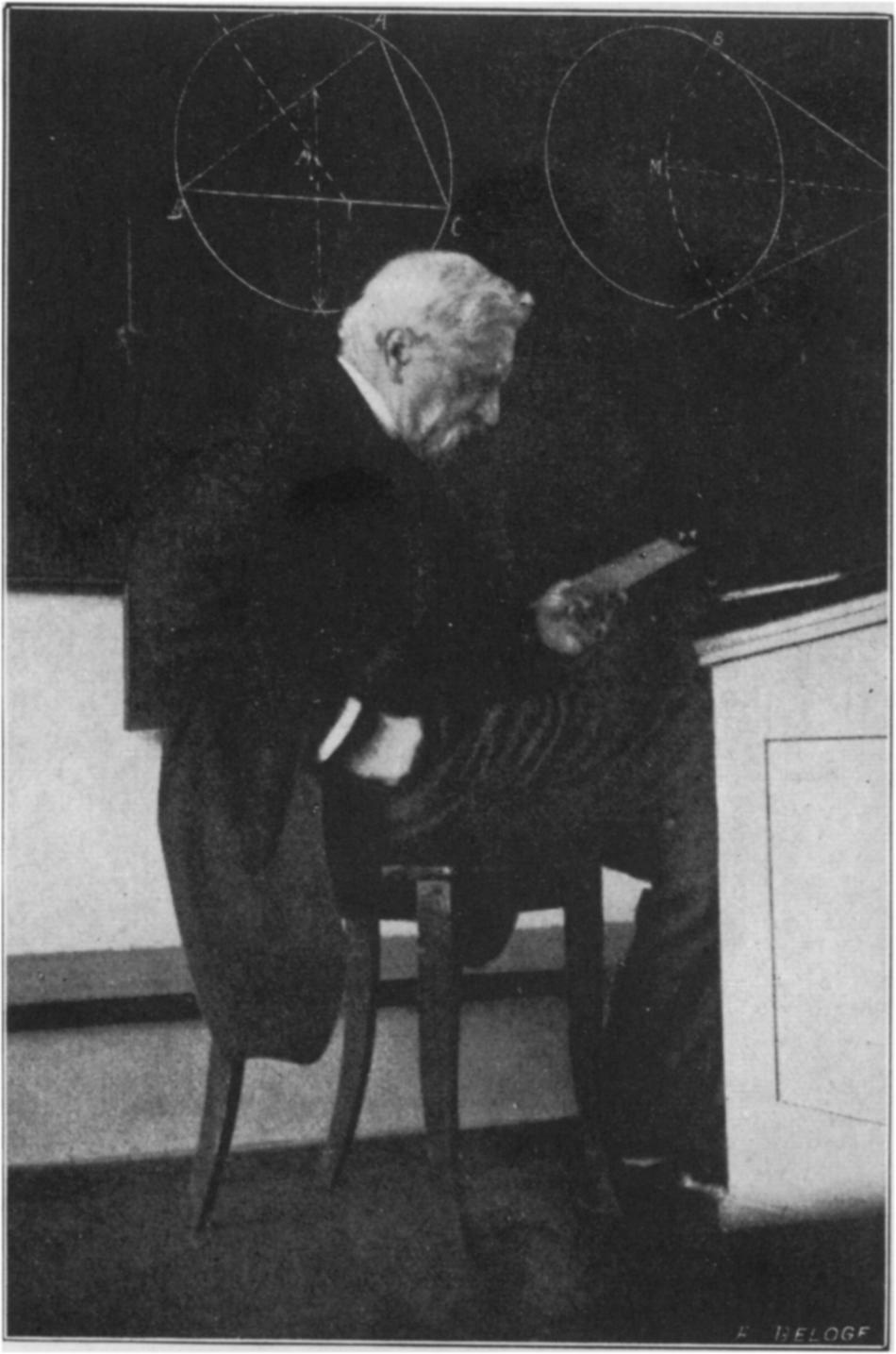
Heinrich Suter

Heinrich Suter (4 January 1848 in Hedingen – 17 March 1922 in Dornach) was a Swiss historian of science specializing in Islamic mathematics and astronomy.

== Biography ==
After graduation from the Industrie Schule at Zürich, Suter studied in Berlin (1869/70) and at ETH Zürich and the University of Zürich. He received in 1871 from the University of Zürich his Promovierung (Ph.D.) with dissertation Geschichte der mathematischen Wissenschaften von den ältesten Zeiten bis Ende des 16. Jahrhunderts. His dissertation was published in 1872 as a book and was subsequently translated into Russian.

In 1874, after his doctorate, Suter taught at the Wettingen Teachers' training College in Aargau, and then at the Gymnasium in Schaffhausen, then taught from 1876 to 1886 in Aarau as a teacher of mathematics and physics, and finally from 1886 until his retirement in 1918 at the cantonal school of Zurich. He started to learn Arabic during his days in Zurich.

Suter in his early forties learned Arabic and acquired some knowledge of Syriac, Persian and Turkish. He studied the history of mathematics and astronomy in the Islamic societies. In Moritz Cantor's "Abhandlungen zur Geschichte der Mathematik“ were published in 1892 Suter's translation of the mathematically related entries in the Kitāb al-Fihrist of Ibn al-Nadim and in 1893 Suter's translation of the mathematical parts of the catalog of the Khedivial Library in Cairo. One of his most important works is his work, commissioned by the Royal Danish Academy of Sciences, on the astronomical tables of Al-Khwarizmi.

In 1904 Suter was an Invited Speaker of the ICM in Heidelberg.

== Private life ==
Suter was married to Hermine Frauenfelder. They had three daughters.

== Distinctions ==
- 1922: Honorary doctorate from the University of Zurich

== Publications ==
=== Books ===
- 1871. Geschichte der mathematischen Wissenschaften, Teil 1 : Von den ältesten Zeiten bis Ende des 16. Jahrhunderts. Dissertation, 2. Aufl. 1873. Reprint 1973. HathiTrust
- 1875. Geschichte der mathematischen Wissenschaften, Teil II : Vom Anfange des 17. bis gegen Ende des 18. Jahrhunderts. HathiTrust
- 1900. Die Mathematiker und Astronomen der Araber und ihre Werke. Abhandl. zur Geschichte der mathematischen Wissenschaften, Heft 10. Reprint 1972 und 1986. bibalex

=== Articles ===
- 1884. Der Tractatus de quadratura Circuli des ALBERTUS DE SAXONIA. ZM. 29, 81.
- 1886 Ueber diophantische Gleichungen. Z. f. Math. Unterr. 17, 104.
- Suter, Heinrich (1887). Die Mathematiker auf den Universitäten des Mittelalters (in German). Zurich: Druck von Zürcher und Furrer.
- 1889. Die mathematischen und naturphilosophischen Disputationen an der Universität Leipzig, 1512 bis 1526. BM. (2), 3, 17.
- 1890. Bibliographische Notiz über die math.-hist. Studien in der Schweiz. BM (2), 4, 97.
- 1892. Das Mathematiker-Verzeichnis im Fihrist des IBN ABI JA QUB AN-NADiM. Abhandl. z. Gesch. d. math. Wissenschaften Heft. 6.
- Suter, Heinrich (1892). Das Mathematiker-Verzeichnis im Fihrist des Ibn Abi Jakub an-Nadim (in German). Leipzig: Teubner.
- 1892. Einiges von NASiR ED-DIN'S EUKLID-Ausgabe. BM. (2), 6, 3.
- 1893. Zur Geschichte der Trigonometrie. BM. (2), 7, 1.
- 1893. Der V. Band des Katalogs der arab. Bücher der vicekönigl. Bibliothek in Kairo. ZM. 38, 1. 41. 161.
- 1893. Zu RUDLOFF und HOCHHEIM, Die Astronomie des GAGMINI. ZDMG 47, 718.
- 1894. Zur Frage über JOSEPHUS SAPIENS. BM (2), 8, 84.
- 1895. Die Araber als Vermittler der Wissenschaften in deren Uebergang vom Orient zum Occident. Jahresh. des Vereins schw. Gymnasiallehrer. 2. Aufl. 1897.
- 1895. Zur Geschichte des Jakobsstabes. BM (2), 9, 13.
- 1895. 1896. Nochmals der Jakobsstab. BM (2), 10, 13.
- 1895. 1897. Einige Beiträge zur Gesch. der arab. Mathematiker und Astronomen. BM (2) 11, 83.
- 1895. Bemerkungen zu M. STEINSCHNEIDERS Abhandlung : Die arab. Uebersetzungen aus dem Griechischen. ZDMG 51, 426.
- 1898. Ueber zwei arabische Mss. der Berliner kgl. Bibliothek. BM (2),1 2, 73.
- 1899. Notizen über arabische Mathematiker und Astronomen. BM (2) 13. 86, 118.
- 1899. Die Kreisquadratur des IBN EL-HAITAM, arabisch und deutsch. ZM 44, 33.
- 1899. Der Loculus Archimedius oder das Syntemachion des ARCHIMEDES, arabisch und deutsch. ZM 44, Supplement-Heft (Cantorfestschrift), 491.
- 1899. Zur Frage über die Lebenszeit des Verfassers des Mulahhas fi'Ihei'a, MAHMUD B. MUHAMMED B. 'OMAR AL GAGMINI. ZDMG 53, 539.
- 1901. Das Rechenbuch des ABU ZAKARIJA EL-HASSAR BM (3) 2, 12.
- 1902. Nachträge und Berichtigungen zu Die Math. und Astr. Abh. z. G. d. m. W. Heft 14.
- 1902. Ueber die angebliche Verstümmelung griechischer Eigennamen durch arab. Uebersetzer. BM (3) 3, 408.
- 1902. Ueber die Geometrie der Söhne des MUSA B. SCHAKIR. BM (3) 3, 259.
- 1902. Ueber die im Liber augmenti et diminutionis vorkommenden Autoren. BM (3) 3, 350.
- 1903. Ueber einige nicht sichergestellte Autorennamen in den Uebersetzungen des GERHARD VON CREMONA. BM (3) 4, 19.
- 1903. Der Verfasser des Buches Gründe der Tafeln des CHOWAREZMI BM (3) 4, 127.
- 1903. Berichtigung einer Etymologie von K. VOLLERS. ZDMG 57, 576, 783.
- 1903. Berichtigungen zu Arabische Mathematiker und Astronomen von M. STEINSCHNEIDER, OLZ 6, Spalte 40-13.
- 1904. Zur Geschichte der Mathematik bei den Indern und Arabern. Verh. d. 3. internat. Mathematiker-Kongr. zu Heidelberg S. 556.
- 1905. Zu dem Buche De superficierum divisionibus des MUHAMMED BAGDADINUS. BM (2) 6, 321.
- 1905. Ueber die Bedeutung des Ausdruckes Regula Coeci.BM (3) 6, 112.
- 1906/7. Zur Frage des von NAIRIZI zitierten Mathematikers Diachasimus. BM (3) 7, 396.
- 1906/7. Ueber das Rechenbuch des ALI B. AHMED AL-NASAWI. BM (3) 7, 113.
- 1906/7. Ueber den Kommentar des MUH. B. ABDELBAQI zum 10. Buche des Euklides. BM(3) 7, 234.
- 1907/8. Einige geometrische Aufgaben bei arabischen Mathematikern. BM (3) 8, 23.
- 1908/9. Die Abhandlung des ABU KAMIL SCHOGA B. ASLAM über das Fünfeck und Zehneck. BM (3) 10, 15
- 1908/9. Zur Trigonometrie der Araber. BM (3) 10. 156.
- 1910/11. Das Buch der Auffindung der Sehnen im Kreise von Abū'l-Raiḥān Muḥ. el-Bīrūnī. BM (3) 11, 110.
- 1910/11. Das Buch der Seltenheiten der Rechenkunst von ABU KAMIL EL-MISRI. BM (3), 11, 100.
- 1911/12. Die Abhandlung über die Ausmessung des Paraboloides von EL-HASAN B. EL-HASAN B. EL HAITHAM. BM (3), 12, 289.
- 1914. Die astronomischen Tafeln des MUHAMMAD IBN MUSA AL-KHWARIZMI usw. Kgl. Danske Vidensk. Selsk. Skrifter, 7. Raekke. III, 1. (Isis IV, 502).
- 1916/17. Ueber die Ausmessung der Parabel von TABIT B. KURRA SE. 48/49, 65. (Isis IV, 400).
- 1916/17. Die Abhandlungen THABIT B. KURRA's und ABU SAHL EL-KUHI'S über die Ausmessung der Paraboloide SE. 48/39, 186. (Isis IV 400).
- 1918. Ueber die Ausmessung der Parabel von IBRAHIM SINAN B. THABIT. Vierteljahrsschrift d. Naturf. Ges. in Zürich 63, 214. (Isis IV, 580).
- 1920/21. Ueber AL BIRUNI und seine Schriften (mit E. WIEDEMANN) SE. 52/53, 55 (Isis IV, 401).
- 1922. Beiträge zur Gesch. d. Mathematik bei den Griechen und Arabern, in Abh. z. Gesch. d. Naturw. u. d. Medizin, (Isis V, 564) und zwar:
- 1922. Beiträge zu den Beziehungen Kaiser FRIEDRICHS II, zu zeitgenössischen Gelehrten des Ostens und Westens, insbesondere zu den arabischen Enzyklopädisten KEMAL ED-DiN IBN JUNIS. (Isis V, 501).
- 1922. Der Kommentar des PAPPUS zum X. Buch des Euklides. (Isis V, 492).
- 1922. Ueber die Projektion der Sternbilder und der Länder von AL BIRUNI (Isis V, 498).
- 1922. Das Buch der geometrischen Konstruktionen von ABUL WEFA. (Isis V, 497).

BM. – Bibliotheca Mathematica, ZM. – Zeitschrift für Mathematik und Physik, ZDMG – Zeitschrift der Deutschen Morgenländischen Gesellschaft, SE – Sitzungsberichte der phys.-med. Sozietät Erlangen, OLZ – Orientalistische Literatur-Zeitung.

=== Collections ===
- Suter: Beiträge zur Geschichte der Mathematik und Astronomie im Islam, 2 Bände, 1986, Institut für Geschichte der arabisch-islamischen Wissenschaften, Frankfurt
