= Amin al-Din Rashid al-Din Vatvat =

13th century Persian physician

Amin al-Din Rashid al-Din Vatvat was a 13th-century Persian physician.

The National Library of Medicine possesses an untitled Persian treatise on general preparation of food and drink which gives the author as Amin al-Din Rashid Vatvat and specifies that it was composed for Arghun Khan who ruled from 1284 to 1291CE.

A much shorter treatise on the same topic, also written by the order of Arghun Khan, is preserved in another untitled manuscript where the author is given as Amin al-Din Rashid al-Din Otaji. A Persian tabular treatise on the same topic written by Amin al-Din Otaji and dedicated to Mahmud Ghazan Khan (who ruled from 1295 to 1304CE) is preserved in two copies.

For both these treatises see C.A. Storey, Persian Literature: A Bio-Bibliographical Survey, volume II, part 2: E. Medicine (London: Royal Asiatic Society, 1971), p. 217 no. 373.

The treatise now at the National Library of Medicine, with author given as Amin al-Din Rashid Vatvat, is presumably by the same author whose name appears as Amin al-Din Rashid al-Din Otaji in other manuscripts.

This Amin al-Din Rashid al-Din Vatvat cannot be the same person as Rashid al-Din Muhammad al-Umari Vatvat who lived in the 12th century and wrote in the name of the governor of Khvarazm (a northern province of Persia) to two prominent physicians in Baghdad, Abu al-Barakat al-Baghdad (d. 1165CE) and Ibn al-Tilmidh asking them to recommend a physician from amongst their students who could take over al-Jurjani's position as court physician following his death around 1136CE. For this earlier Rashid al-Din al-Vatvat, see Lutz Richter-Bernburg, Persian Medical Manuscripts at the University of California, Los Angeles: A Descriptive Catalogue, Humana Civilitas, vol. 4 (Malibu: Udena Publications, 1978), p. 3.

== See also ==
- List of Iranian scientists
