= Najm al-Din Mahmud ibn Ilyas al-Shirazi =

Persian physician

Najm al-Din Mahmud ibn Ilyas al-Shirazi (Persian: نجم‌الدین محمود بن الیاس شیرازی, died 1330) was a Persian physician from Shiraz in Persia.

His major composition was a large Arabic medical compendium, Kitab al-Hawi fi ‘ilm al-tadawi (The Comprehensive Book on the Art of Curing), whose title often caused confusion with the better-known Kitab al-Hawi (The Comprehensive Book) written four centuries earlier by Rhazes. The treatise cites by name many earlier medical authorities, including Hippocrates and Galen, as well as Arabic writers. Little else is known of his life.

== See also ==
- List of Iranian scientists

== Sources ==
For what little is known of his life and writings, see:

- Manfred Ullmann, Die Medizin im Islam, Handbuch der Orientalistik, Abteilung I, Erg?nzungsband vi, Abschnitt 1 (Leiden: E.J. Brill, 1970), p. 178
- Lutz Richter-Bernburg, Persian Medical Manuscripts at the University of California, Los Angeles: A Descriptive Catalogue, Humana Civilitas, vol. 4 (Malibu: Udena Publications, 1978), pp 25–27
- C. Brockelmann, Geschichte der arabischen Litteratur, Supplement, 3 vols. (Leiden: Brill, 1937–1942), vol. 1 p. 901 and vol. 2, pp 298–9.
