= Jaghmini =

Arab physician, astronomer and author

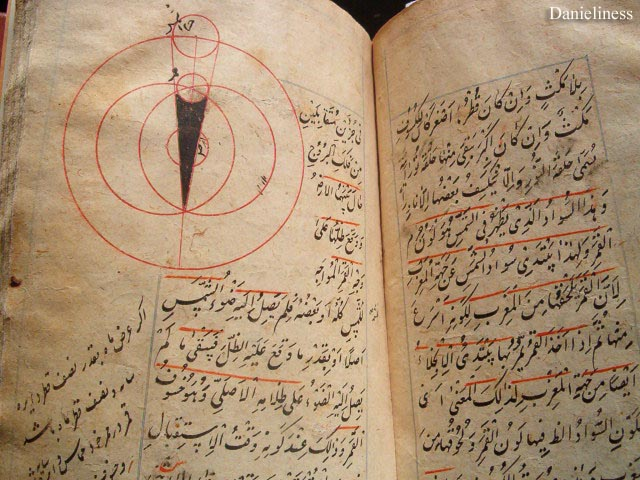
A manuscript of al-Mulakhkhas fi al-hay'ah written in Arabic by al-Jaghmini (from a private collection).

Mahmūd ibn Muḥammad ibn Umar al-Jaghmini (Arabic: محمود بن محمد بن عمر الجغميني) or 'al-Chaghmīnī', or al-Jaghmini, was a 13th or 14th-century Arab physician, astronomer and author of the Qanunshah (The Canon of Medicine) a short epitome of by Avicenna in Persian, and Mulakhkhas (Summary), a work on astronomy.

Little of him is known beyond what is indicated by his name, that he was a native of Jaghmin, a village in Khwarezm (Khiva), current day Uzbekistan. He is sometimes confused with another Jaghmini who lived until the mid-14th century, but multiple sources show he was alive in the early 13th.

== Qanunche ==
The popularity of the Qanunshah may be indicated by the number of scholarly commentaries it produced. Two were by contemporaries of his, the scientists Ghazī Zade Rūmi and Mīr Seyed Sharīf Gorganī. Several versified versions were also produced and considerable evidence exists of its use in medical teaching in the eastern provinces of the Islamic world.

== Mulakhkhas ==
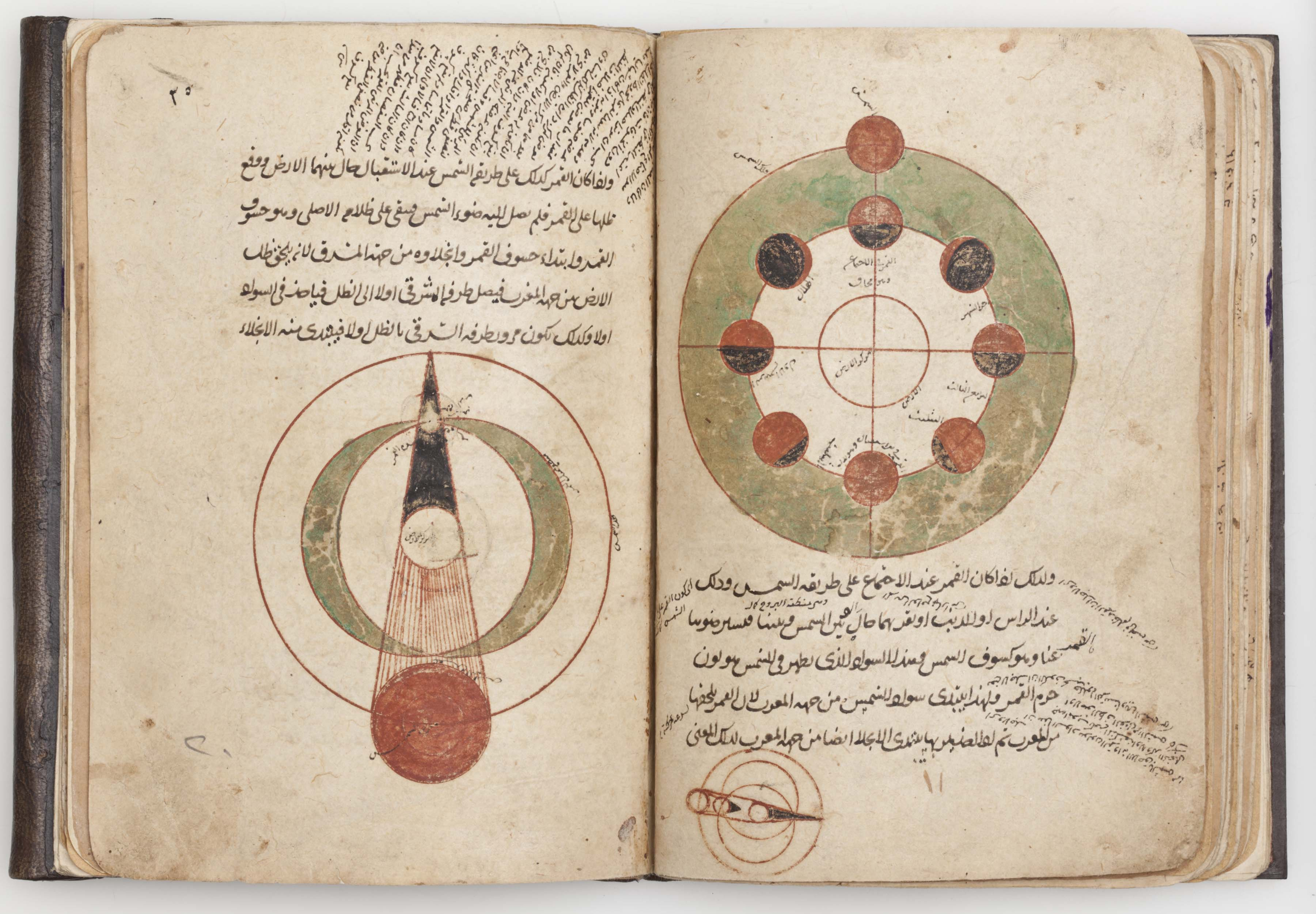
Manuscript of al-Mulakhkhas fi al-Hay'ah in the Khalili Collection of Islamic Art

The al-Mulakhkhas fi al-Hay'ah ("Epitome of plain theoretical astronomy") is an astronomical textbook describing the celestial orbs, the Earth, and their relations. It is simplified compared to other astronomical texts from the same period, in that it lacks proofs and does not discuss the distances or sizes of celestial objects. Written in the early 13th century, it started an educational tradition that lasted until the 18th. Many commentaries were written in Arabic and Persian and both commentators and copyists updated or corrected the information as time went on. A commentary written in 1412 by the mathematician Qāḍī Zāda al-Rūmī became, in turn, the subject of numerous super-commentaries.

The celebrated Ottoman-Turkish historian Haji Khalifa, in his biographic account contained in Sullam al-Wusūl, mentions reading al-Jaghmini's Mulakhas, together with another astronomical work, Ashkal al-ta'sis (Note: Geometrical work on Euclid's 35 propositions. Musa ibn Muhammad Qadizade also wrote a commentary on the work.) by Shams al-Din Muhammad ibn Ashraf al-Samarqandi, with his tutor A'rej Mustafa Efendi, between the years 1643-45 AD.

== Sources ==
- Kâtip Çelebi (1957). Balance of Truth. Translated by G.L. Lewis. London: George Allen & Unwin Ltd. pp. 141, 154.

== Bibliography ==
For a discussion of his popular epitome, the Qanuncheh, and the use made of it by subsequent generations of medical students, see:

- A. Z. Iskandar, A Catalogue of Arabic Manuscripts on Medicine and Science in the Wellcome Historical Medical Library (London: The Wellcome Historical Medical Library, 1967), pp. 56–64.
- C.A. Storey, Persian Literature: A Bio-Bibliographical Survey. Volume II, Part 1: A. Mathematics, B. Weights and Measures, C. Astronomy and Astrology, D. Geography (London: Luzac, 1958), p. 219.
- Carl Brockelmann, Geschichte der arabischen Litteratur, 1st edition, 2 vols. (Leiden: Brill, 1889-1936). Second edition, 2 vols. (Leiden: Brill, 1943–49). Page references will be to those of the first edition, with the 2nd edition page numbers given in parentheses, p. 473 (625)
- Carl Brockelmann, Geschichte der arabischen Litteratur, Supplement, 3 vols. (Leiden: Brill, 1937-1942). vol. 1, p. 865.
- Manfred Ullmann, Die Medizin im Islam, Handbuch der Orientalistik, Abteilung I, Ergänzungsband vi, Abschnitt 1 (Leiden: E.J. Brill, 1970), p. 154 note 4.
- Lutz Richter-Bernburg, Persian Medical Manuscripts at the University of California, Los Angeles: A Descriptive Catalogue, Humana Civilitas, vol. 4 (Malibu: Udena Publications, 1978), p. 28.
- C.A. Storey, Persian Literature: A Bio-Bibliographical Survey. Volume II, Part 1: A. Mathematics, B. Weights and Measures, C. Astronomy and Astrology, D. Geography (London: Luzac, 1958), p. 50 no. 88.

== See also ==
- List of Iranian scientists
