= Medical Encyclopedia of Islam and Iran =

Series of reference books

- Editor: Iran's Academy of Medical Sciences
- Author: Various scholars
- Original title: دانشنامه پزشکی اسلام و ایران
- Language: Persian
- Subject: History of medicine, Islamic medicine
- Genre: Reference work
- Publisher: Iran's Academy of Medical Sciences
- Publication date: 2011–present
- Publication place: Iran
- Media type: Print, Online
- Pages: 5 volumes (ongoing)

The Medical Encyclopedia of Islam and Iran is a series of reference books being prepared in the Iran's Academy of Medical Sciences. The objective of this project is to publish a 5-volume collection; each one consisting of 1000 pages and 500 articles. Its content will include a history of medicine in Iran and other Islamic countries. So far, a limited number of books and references have been published in Iran and this matter has been the motive of the Academy of Medical Sciences to collect references and compiling the encyclopedia.

The field of activity and the subject of the articles are biography of famous Iranian and foreign physicians, pharmacologists, pharmacists and herbalists in past centuries, hospitals, medical schools and centers, drugs, herbs, medical instruments and terms in the history of medicine. The articles should be prepared consisting of about 1200 words, but apparently, a few articles will be longer than this limitation. Since this book will be published in Iran, it is in Persian. However, the Academy of Medical Sciences intends to translate it into English after publishing all of its volumes.

The geographical zone of the articles will be the medical Sciences in Iran, Ottoman (Turkey), Egypt, Mesopotamia, India (while a part of it was ruled by Muslims), and Spain (in areas with mostly Muslims citizens). In general, the most important aim of this book is to introduce history of medicine to the readers. Medical science has had many vicissitudes in Iran. Once, this science was the centre of attention. Renowned scientists like Avicenna and Rhazes have written books about it. In other times, it has stagnated. Therefore, if someone wants to know something about these persons or other physicians, one can refer to this book. Since, in conformity with the specified plan, there are different articles in this book, it is necessary a variety of authors who study about the history of medicine or are interested in this subject in different part of the world get familiar with it.

The first volume of the book was published in 2011, In 2016 the 'Medical Encyclopedia of Islam and Iran' was updated and re-published as Volume 2. It was updated again (as Volume 3) in 2018.

== See also ==
- History of medicine
- List of Iranian scientists and scholars
- Commission on Scientific Signs in the Quran and Sunnah
- I'jaz
- Iranian traditional medicine
- Islamic attitudes towards science
- Islamic views on evolution
- Islamic view of miracles
- Medicine in the medieval Islamic world
- Miracles of Muhammad
- Muhammad ibn Zakariya al-Razi
- Prophetic medicine
- Quran and miracles
