= Carl Brockelmann =

German Semitist (1868–1956)

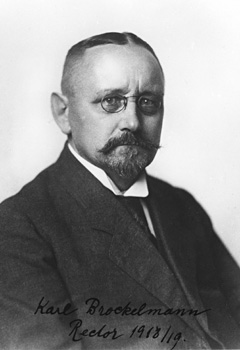
- Born: 17 September 1868; Rostock, Grand Duchy of Mecklenburg-Schwerin
- Died: 6 May 1956 (aged 87); Halle an der Saale, East Germany
- Occupations: German Author, University of Wrocław professor, Orientalist, Semitist
- Notable work: Geschichte der arabischen Litteratur (1898–1902), Lexicon Syriacum (1895), Kurzgefasste vergleichende Grammatik der semitischen Sprachen (1908), Abessinsche Studien (1950)

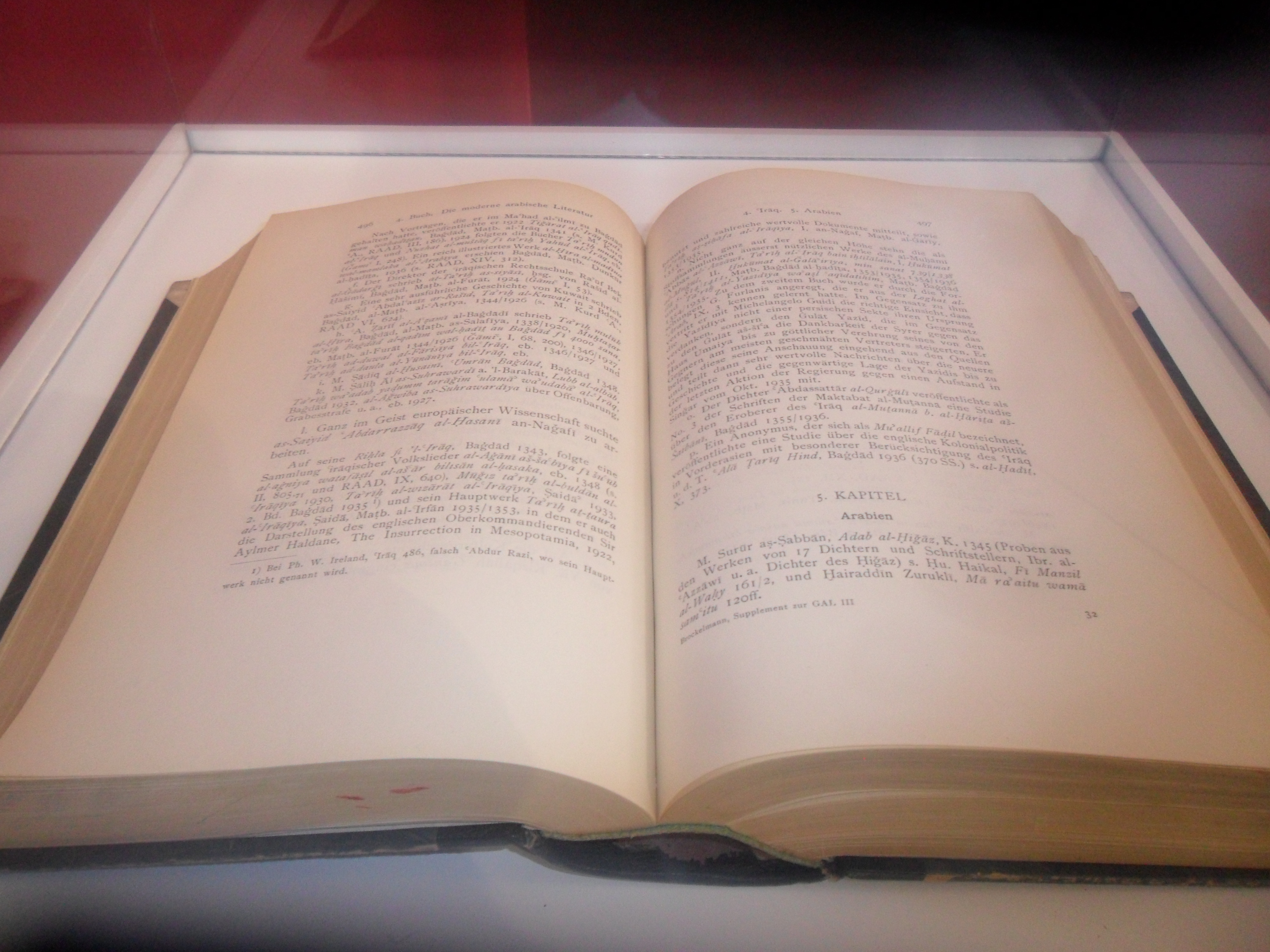
History of Arabic Literature 1909 - Carl Brocklmann

Carl Brockelmann (17 September 1868 – 6 May 1956) was a German Semitist and the foremost orientalist of his generation. He was a professor at the universities in Breslau, Berlin and, from 1903, Königsberg. He is best known for his multi-volume Geschichte der arabischen Litteratur ('History of Arabic literature'; first published 1898–1902) which included all writers in Arabic to 1937, and remains the fundamental reference volume for all Arabic literature, apart from the Christian Arabic texts (covered by Georg Graf).

He also published Syrische Grammatik mit Litteratur, Chrestomathie und Glossar (1899), Semitische Sprachwissenschaft (1906), Lexicon syriacum (1928), and Arabische Grammatik (under his own name 1941, but this was the eleventh edition of the grammar of Albert Socin, previously revised by Brockelmann several times).

== Career ==
Brockelmann pursued Oriental studies, classical philology, and history in Rostock, Breslau, and Strasburg. He earned his Ph.D. in Strasburg, in 1890, under the direction of Theodor Nöldeke, and his Dr. habil. degree in Breslau in 1893. In 1900 he was appointed to a chair in Breslau, in 1903 in Königsberg, in 1910 in Halle, in 1922 in Berlin, and in 1923 in Breslau again. From 1932 to 1933 he served as the rector of the Breslau University. After his retirement in 1935 he returned to Halle/Saale, where he died.

== Works ==
- Brockelmann, Carl (1895). Lexicon Syriacum (1st ed.). Berlin: Reuther & Reichard.
  - Brockelmann, Carl (1928) [1895]. Lexicon Syriacum (2nd ed.). Halle: Niemeyer.
- Geschichte der arabischen Litteratur. First published as Geschichte der Arabischen Litteratur, 2 vols (Weimar: Felber, 1898-1902). Brockelmann then published three Supplementband ('supplement volumes'): Geschichte der arabischen Litteratur. Supplementband, 3 vols (Leiden: Brill, 1937-42). Thereafter, he published a second edition of the original two volumes: Geschichte der Arabischen Litteratur, [2nd edn], 2 vols (Leiden: Brill, 1943-49). The complete set was then corrected and translated into English: Carl Brockelmann, History of the Arabic Written Tradition, trans. by Joep Lameer, Handbook of Oriental Studies. Section 1 The Near and Middle East, 117, 5 vols in 6 (Leiden: Brill, 2016-19), ISBN 978-90-04-33462-5
- Brockelmann, Carl (1899). Syrische Grammatik mit Litteratur, Chrestomathie und Glossar (1st ed.). Berlin: Reuther & Reichard.
  - Brockelmann, Carl (1905) [1899]. Syrische Grammatik mit Paradigmen, Literatur, Chrestomathie und Glossar (2nd ed.). Berlin: Reuther & Reichard.
- Geschichte der christlichen Literaturen des Orients. 2nd Edition. Leipzig 1909
- Kurzgefasste vergleichende Grammatik der semitischen Sprachen. Berlin: Reuther and Reichard. 1908
- Grundriss der vergleichenden Grammatik der semitischen Sprachen. Vols. 1–2, 1908/1913
- Semitische Sprachwissenschaft. 2nd Edition. 1916
- Geschichte der islamischen Völker und Staaten. R. Oldenbourg, München/ Berlin 1939
  - History Of The Islamic Peoples, 1939 and 1960
- Abessinische Studien. Berlin: Akademie Verlag. 1950
- Osttürkische Grammatik der islamischen Literatur-Sprachen Mittelasiens. Leiden 1954
- Hebräische Syntax. 1956
- Arabische Grammatik. Berlin and others 1904, Carl Brockelmann at the Internet Archive. Numerous new editions, including Leipzig 1960 (revision of the grammar by Albert Socin).
