= List of Christian scientists and scholars of the medieval Islamic world =

This is a list of Christian scientists and scholars from the Muslim world and Spain (Al-Andalus) who lived during medieval Islam up until the beginning of the modern age. Christian converts to Islam are also included.

The following Muslim naming articles are not used for indexing:

- Al - the
- ibn, bin, banu - son of
- abu - father of, the one with

== A ==
- Aaron of Alexandria a physician active in the 7th century. His works were translated into Arabic and Syriac, and were used later by al-Razi.
- Abdollah ibn Bukhtishu (940–1058) Syriac physician.
- Athanasius II Baldoyo Syriac Orthodox historian and Patriarch of Antioch.
- Ammar al-Basri 9th-century East Syrian theologian and apologist.
- Anthony of Tagrit 9th-century West Syrian Syriac theologian and Rhetorician.
- Abdisho bar Berika (died 1318) Syriac writer and bishop.

== B ==
- Bukhtishu (7th–9th centuries) family of Syriac Christian physicians.
- ibn Batriq (877–940) physician and melkite Patriarch of Alexandria.
- Ibn Butlan (1038, 1075) Arab Church of the East Christian physician.
- Abu Bishr Matta ibn Yunus (870 – 20 June 940) Church of the East Christian philosopher and translator.

== D ==
- Dionysius I Telmaharoyo (died 845) Syriac Orthodox historian Patriarch of Antioch.

== G ==
- Gerasimos, Abbot of the Monastery of Saint Symeon (fl. between 9th and 13th centuries), knowledgeable Christian apologist

== H ==
- Hunayn ibn Ishaq (809–873) Arab Christian scholar, physician, and scientist.

== I ==
- Ishaq ibn Hunayn (c. 830 – c. 910–11) Arab Christian physician and translator.
- Ishodad of Merv (fl. 850 AD) Syriac theologian and writer.

== J ==
- Jabril ibn Bukhtishu 8th century Church of the East physician.
- Jacob Bar-Salibi, most prolific writer in the Syriac Orthodox Church of the twelfth century.
- Jacob of Edessa (c. 640 – 5 June 708) Syriac apologist and philosopher.
- Job of Edessa, a Christian natural philosopher and physician active in Baghdad and Khurāsān under the Abbasid Caliphate. He played an important role in transmitting Greek science to the Islamic world through his translations into Syriac.
- John III of the Sedre theologian.
- John bar Penkaye 7th century historian.

== K ==
- Abu Yûsuf ibn Ishâq al-Kindī Arab Christian scholar and Apologist

== M ==
- Masawaiyh (circa 777–857) Church of the East Christian physician.
- Abu Sahl 'Isa ibn Yahya al-Masihi Persian Christian physician.
- Masawaih al-Mardini Syriac Orthodox Christian physician.
- Michael the Syrian (died 1199 AD) Syriac Orthodox Chronologist and Patriarchs of Antioch.

== N ==
- Nastulus.

== Q ==
- Qusta ibn Luqa (820–912) Syrian Melkite physician, scientist and translator.
- Ibn al-Quff (1233–1286) Arab Melkite physician, surgeon and author
- Ibn al-Qilai (1447–1516) Maronite historian, theologian and poet.

== R ==
- Ishaq bin Ali al-Rohawi 9th-century Arab physician and the author of the first medical ethics book in Arabic medicine.
- Abu Raita al-Takriti Syriac Orthodox theologian and apologist.

== S ==
- Shapur ibn Sahl (died 869 AD) Persian Christian physician from the Academy of Gundishapur.
- Salmawaih ibn Bunan (died 840) Church of the East Christian physician and translator.
- Serapion the Younger.
- Sahl ibn Bishr (c. 786–845?) Syriac Christian astrologer, astronomer and mathematician.

== T ==
- Ibn al-Tilmīdh (1074–1165) Syriac Christian physician, pharmacist, poet, musician and calligrapher.
- Theodosius Romanus (died 1 June 896) Syriac Orthodox translator and Patriarch of Antioch.
- Theodore Abu Qurrah (c. 750 – c. 823) Orthodox Christian theologian and writer.
- Thomas of Marga 9th century East Syrian bishop and author of an important monastic history in Syriac.

== U ==
- Ibn Uthal 7th-century Arab Christian physician.

== Y ==
- Yahya ibn Sarafyun (9th century) Syriac physician.
- Yuhanna ibn Bukhtishu (9th century) Church of the East Christian physician.
- Yahya Ibn al-Batriq Syrian astronomer and translator.
- Yahya ibn Adi (893–974) Syriac Orthodox philosopher, theologian and translator.

== Z ==
- Ibn Zur'a (943–1008) Syriac Orthodox Christian physician and philosopher.

== See also ==
- Islamic science
- List of Muslim scientists
- List of Iranian scientists and scholars
- List of Arab scientists and scholars
- List of medieval European scientists
