= Christian influences on the Islamic world =

Christian influences in Islam can be traced back to Eastern Christianity, which surrounded the origins of Islam. Islam, emerging in the context of a Middle East with various Christian populations, was first seen as a Christological heresy known as the "heresy of the Ishmaelites", described as such in Concerning Heresy by Saint John of Damascus.

Christians introduced the Muslims to Greek learning. Eastern Christian scientists and scholars of the medieval Islamic world (particularly Nestorian Christians) contributed to the Arab Islamic civilization during the Umayyad and the Abbasid periods by translating works of Greek philosophers to Syriac and afterwards to Arabic. They also excelled in philosophy, science, theology and medicine.

Scholars and intellectuals agree Eastern Christians have made significant contributions to Arab and Islamic civilization since the introduction of Islam, and they have had a significant impact contributing to the culture of the Middle East and North Africa and other areas.

Christian communities have played a vital role in the Muslim World. Pew Research Center estimates indicate that in 2010, more than 64 million Christians lived in countries with Muslim majorities (excluding Nigeria). The Pew Forum study finds that Indonesia (21.1 million) has the largest Christian population in the Muslim world, followed by Egypt, Chad and Kazakhstan. The majority of Muslim countries also use a Gregorian calendar and some countries observe Sunday as a non-working day (cf. Sunday Sabbatarianism).

== Prayer and worship ==
The religion of Islam has been claimed to have been molded by Assyrian Christians and Jews. In explicating the origin of the Islamic salat, academics state that it was influenced by the religions prevalent in the Middle East during the time of Muhammad, such as Christianity and Judaism. The five fixed prayer times in Islamic prayer may have their origins in the canonical hours of Christians, especially those used in the 4th century by believers in the Oriental Orthodox Churches (that were widely regarded as Miaphysite) who prayed seven times a day, given the extensive contact that Muhammad and his companions had with Syrian Christian monks. Abu Bakr and other early followers of Muhammad were exposed to these fixed times of prayer of the Syrian Christians in Abyssinia and likely relayed their observations to Muhammad, "placing the potential for Christian influence directly within the Prophet's circle of followers and leaders." Muhammad, who had direct contact with the Christians of Najrān in Yemen, would have been aware of the Christian practice of facing east while praying, which was ubiquitous in Christendom at the time. The position of prostration used by the Desert Fathers, Coptic Christian monks of Egypt, may have influenced the position of sujjud, marked by the Quranic symbol ۩.

The German philosopher Nicholas of Cusa had discovered parts of Nestorian Christianity in the Quran. The Nestorian sect of Christianity was widely practiced in the Middle East during that time. Professor Guillaume, speaking of the Nestorians (but the same would apply to the Monophysites), writes:

In their monasteries monks could be heard chanting their offices, so that the Arabs became accustomed to seeing the monks at prayer day and night, prostrating themselves with their faces to the ground. In prayer, the Christians turned to the east. Such men were a familiar sight on all caravan routes of Arabia.

The Nestorian Christians were puritanical and opposed to showing images of Jesus and the cross. The Nestorians stance against images found firm place within the doctrines of Islam.

Ritual washing before performing the Salah was influenced by the Jewish practice of washing one's hands and feet before praying, a practice common among the Jews in Syria, Yathrib and Yemen; the Babylonian Talmud teaches that in the absence of water, earth should be used, a practice adopted in Islam. The Jews face Jerusalem when praying and the Qur'an records that the early Muslims did the same, with the direction of prayer facing Mecca being changed to this later. Justin Paul Hienz regards these as clear examples of syncretism in which Judaism influenced religious practice in Islam.

According to historian Philip Jenkins, Ramadan comes "from the strict Lenten discipline of the Syrian Churches", a postulation corroborated by other scholars, such as the theologian Paul-Gordon Chandler.

== Cultural influence ==
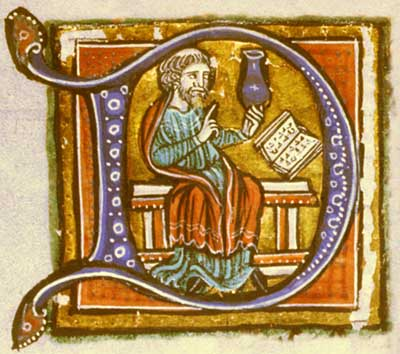
luminure from the Hunayn ibn-Ishaq al-'Ibadi manuscript of the Isagoge. Hunayn ibn-Ishaq was a famous and influential Christian scholar, physician, and scientist of ethnic Arab descent.

Christians (particularly Nestorian Christians) contributed to the Arab Islamic civilization during the Umayyad and the Abbasid periods by translating works of Greek philosophers to Syriac and afterwards to Arabic. During the 4th through the 7th centuries, scholarly work in the Syriac and Greek languages was either newly initiated, or carried on from the Hellenistic period. Centers of learning and of transmission of classical wisdom included colleges such as the School of Nisibis, and later the School of Edessa, and the renowned hospital and medical academy of Jundishapur; libraries included the Library of Alexandria and the Imperial Library of Constantinople; other centers of translation and learning functioned at Merv, Thessalonica, Nishapur and Ctesiphon, situated just south of what later became Baghdad. The House of Wisdom was a library, translation institute, and academy established in Abbasid-era Baghdad, Iraq. Nestorians played a prominent role in the formation of Arab culture, with the Jundishapur school being prominent in the late Sassanid, Umayyad and early Abbasid periods. Notably, eight generations of the Nestorian Bukhtishu family served as private doctors to caliphs and sultans between the 8th and 11th centuries.

Translation of Greek works to Arabic was almost exclusively performed by Christian scholars. Egyptian priest and philosopher George Chehata Anawati mentions over sixty translators, all of whom were Christians except one Jew and one Sabaean. Baghdad received scholars from all over the Abbasid Caliphate who offered their services to the caliphs and rich sponsors. Some sponsors are known to have paid in gold the weight of each book translated into Arabic. The Nestorian Christian Hunayn ibn Ishaq, who worked as a writer and a teacher in the House of Wisdom, was one of the most influential translators of Greek medical and scientific treatises of his day.

Aristotle’s work was preserved in Arabic by Christians in the Muslim world such as the fifth-century priest Probus of Antioch, who introduced Aristotle to the Arab speaking world. Syrian Christian Yahya ibn ‘Adi also translated works of philosophy into Arabic, and wrote one of his own, called "The Reformation of Morals". His student, another Christian named Abu ‘Ali ‘Isa ibn Zur’a, also translated Aristotle and others from Syriac into Arabic. Timothy I of Seleucia-Ctesiphon translated Aristotle's Topics from the Syriac language into Arabic at the request of the Caliph.

The Nestorian Christian Hunayn ibn Ishaq was one of the most famous of these translators. He was a master in the Arabic, Greek, Assyrian and Persian languages. Hunayn is responsible for laying the foundation of scientific and philosophical terminology in Arabic, which was lacking until then, and which was essential for transmitting thought and knowledge. He worked with a team who translated almost the whole corpus of Galen’s medical works, as well as many of the works of Homer, Aristotle, Plato and Hippocrates.

As late as the 11th century, the Muslim philosopher and traveler Nasir Khusraw reported, “Truly, the scribes here in Syria, as is the case of Egypt, are all Christians…[and] it is most usual for the physicians…to be Christians.”

=== Language ===
In the late 7th and 8th centuries, Muslims encountered Levantine Christians. The cognate Syriac word sahedo may have influenced the Arabic shahid ('martyr-witness'). During the Abbasid dynasty, translations of the gospels from Syriac into Arabic were made, particularly by historian Bar-Hebraeus, at the request of the Arab governor. According to Professor Dominique Urvoy of the University of Toulouse-Jean Jaurès the Arabic script may have been created by Christian missionaries from the Christianized Arab city of Hira in ancient Iraq.

Richard Bell notes that the word “surah” is likely a derivation from the Syriac word surta, “used in the sense of Scripture.”

The arabic word "Hanif" which is usually translated as “monotheist,” (specifically one who before the advent of Muhammad was a true believer, that is, a believer in the one true god) comes from the Syriac word "hanephe", which means “heathens,” and is, according to Richard Bell, “the term applied by Christians to the Arabs.”

Linguist Robert Kerr says: “The fact that both the script and language of the Qur’an point to the Classical Arabia Petraea of Syro-Palestine, and not Arabia Deserta, is further supported by the fact that the Qur’an’s vocabulary is largely borrowed from Aramaic, especially Syriac, the liturgical language of the local churches.”

According to linguist Jan Retsö, “Many of the most important and frequent words in the Qur’an are clear Aramaic borrowings, which can be shown by a comparison with Syriac.” These include such key words in Islam as “Lord,” “merciful,” “prostrate,” “repent,” “offering,” “salvation,” “alms,” “Christ,” and even “ayat,” “sura,” and “Qur’an” itself. This coincides with research showing that the earliest mosques faced not Mecca but Petra in modern-day southern Jordan, where Syriac was spoken.

According to Christoph Luxenberg, the word Quran (reading, lectionary") is a rendition of the Aramaic word "qeryana", a book of liturgical readings, i.e. the term for a Syriac lectionary, with hymns and Biblical extracts, created for use in Christian services.

Christoph Luxenberg has examined the Aramaic substratum of the Qur’an Aramaic and notes that the Psalms are mentioned several times in the Qur’an (3:184, 17:55, 21:105, 35:25, 54:43, 54:52). He suggests that the mysterious letters may be vestiges of the Qur’an’s source text having been a Christian lectionary. Quranic scholar Erwin Gräf declares that the Qur’an, “according to the etymological meaning of the word, is originally and really a liturgical text designed for cultic recitation and also actually used in the private and public service. This suggests that the liturgy or liturgical poetry, and indeed the Christian liturgy, which comprises the Judaic liturgy, decisively stimulated and influenced Mohammed,”

=== Art ===
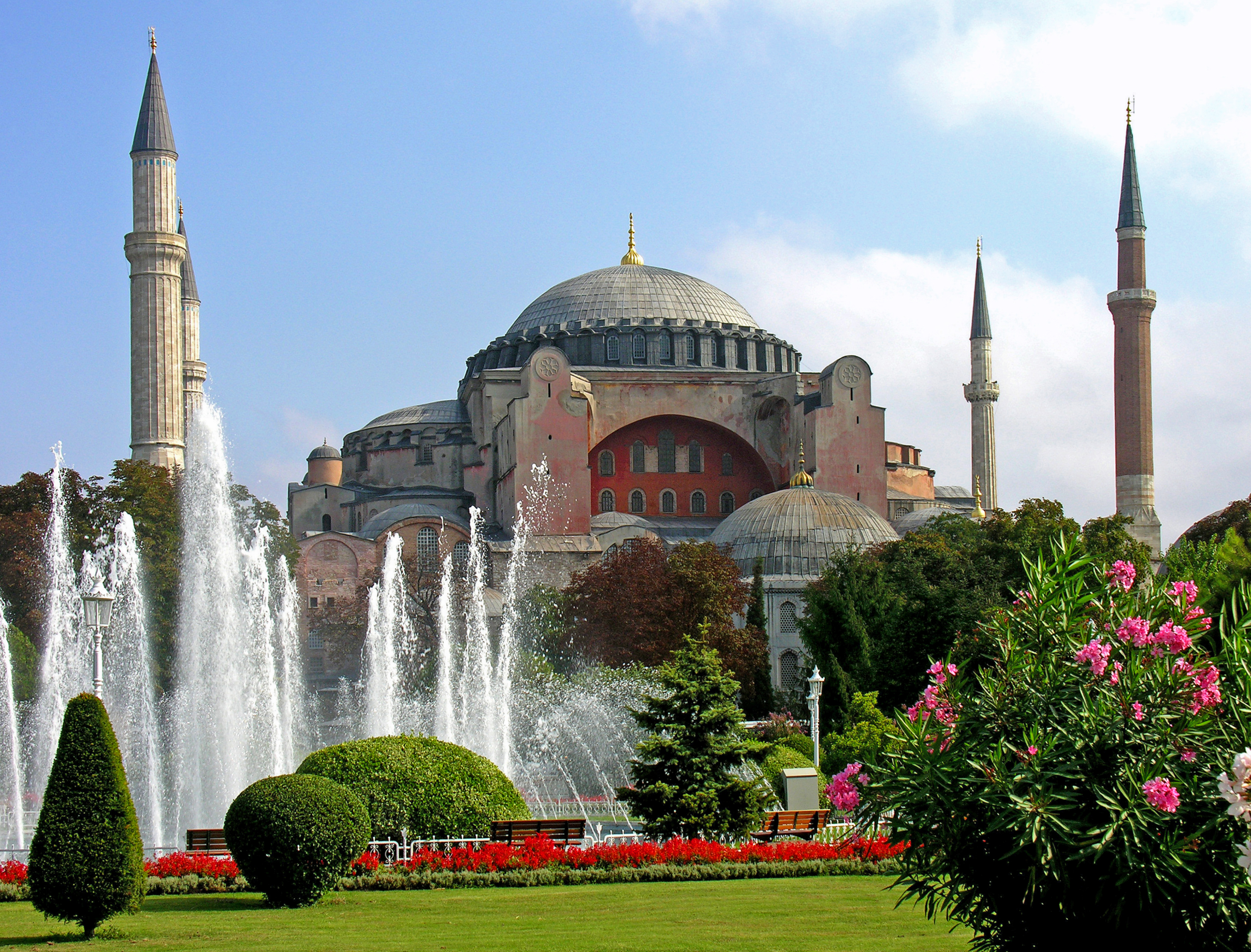
Hagia Sophia, an Eastern Orthodox Christian church converted into a mosque after the Fall of Constantinople; in 1935 it was converted into a museum, following a decision by Kemal Atatürk.

Roman and Byzantine styles were particularly prevalent in early Islamic architecture. One of the examples is the Dome of the Rock (late 7th century) in Jerusalem. Its design is derived from Greco-Roman architecture. Madrasa-Mausoleum of Sultan Al Nasir Muhammad in Cairo has a Gothic doorway from Acre, reused as a trophy. The former Christian cathedral Madrasat al-Halawiyya in Aleppo, probably taken by Nur ad-Din Zangi, featured an altar. The Jami'a Al Aqsa has a sculpted ornament, taken from Crusader structures of the 12th century, in the arches of the facade. The upper double capital of the mosque on twisted columns expresses the unity of nature in a characteristic Romanesque style.

After the fall of Constantinople, the Ottomans converted a major basilica, Hagia Sophia, to a mosque and incorporated Byzantine architectural elements into their own work, such as domes. This was a part of the conversion of non-Muslim places of worship into mosques. The Hagia Sophia also served as model for many Ottoman mosques, such as the Shehzadeh Mosque, the Suleiman Mosque and the Rüstem Pasha Mosque.

Maribel Fierro has observed that all Umayyad mosques feature mosaics of Christian Greek origin, including the Great Mosque of Damascus. The reason why the Umayyad Mosque of Damascus looks like a byzantine church is because it was built and decorated by Greek christian architects from the demolished remains of the church of saint John. Persian Historian Ibn al-Faqih points out that minarets of the Umayyad Mosque of Damascus were originally watch towers in the Church of St. John the Baptist. Muslim rulers endeavored to copy in their mosques the exterior architectural features of Christian churches with the conscious intention of dwarfing and humiliating them. Greek architects also built the al-Aqsa mosque in Jerusalem in 688, and the mosque of Amran in Cairo.

Christological motifs could be found in the works of Nizami, Rumi and others. Islamic artists applied Christian patterns for iconography. The picture of the birth of Muhammad in Rashid ad-Din's Jami' al-tawarikh is reminiscent of the birth of Jesus. The angels, hovering over the mother, correspond to a Christian type, while the three women, who came to visit the mother, conform to the three Biblical Magi. Some surviving Ayyubid inlaid brasses feature Gospel scenes and images of Madonna with infant Jesus. References to the Annunciation and the baptism of Jesus are manifest in al-Athar al-Baqiyah, where the Virgin is depicted in accordance with her representation in Byzantine art.

The frescoes of Samarra, painted between 836 and 883, also suggest the Christian craft because of the Christian priests who are the subjects and the signatures of the artist.

Art historian Oleg Grabar explains the impact that the Christian Roman Empire of the Greeks had on the early muslims:

Byzantine art provided the new culture with a vocabulary and the rudiments of a grammar.… The Muslims turned again and again to the wellspring of Byzantium.… At one time he [Mu’awiyah, then governor of Syria—he would become the future first Umayyad caliph (ruled 661–680)] was upbraided by Caliph Umar for having adopted the pagan ways of the Caesars.… Mu’awiyah answered that Damascus was full of Greeks and that none of them would believe in his power if he did not behave and look like an emperor.… The early Muslims never fully understood Byzantine art, but circumstances having forced it on them, they could not but be impressed by its existence.

The high value placed on Byzantine Brocades in the Islamic world is attested to in al-Tha'alibi's book "Laṭāʼif al-maʻārif" in which Abu Dulaf al-Khazraji prays for godsends, including Byzantine Brocades.

According to the scholar Irfan Shahid, sources point to the influence of the Christian Byzantines and Zoroastrian Persians in the development of music in Arabia.

== Government and administration ==
While researching Palestine under Muslim rule, historian Moshe Gil claims that “the Christians had immense influence and positions of power, chiefly because of the gifted administrators among them who occupied government posts despite the ban in Muslim law against employing Christians [in such positions] or who were part of the intelligentsia of the period because they were outstanding scientists, mathematicians, physicians and so on.” The prominence of Christian officials was also acknowledged by the muslim theologian Al-Qadi Abd al-Jabbar, who reported in the year 995 that “kings in Egypt, al-Sha, Iraq, Jazira, Faris, and in all their surroundings, rely on Christians in matters of officialdom, the central administration and the handling of funds.”

The Christian Byzantine empire may have influenced some aspects of the legal thought of Islam.

== Military ==
Professor Ronnie Ellenblum notes that the Military architecture of the Crusaders influenced the Mamlukes and other Muslim states. The Crusaders introduced to the Muslims key features from thicker and higher concentric walls to posterns, vaulted chambers in the "safe-zones," and massive storage to withstand lengthy sieges.

Being Bedouins, the early Muslims had no knowledge of ship building, so they heavily relied on Christians for the construction and command of their fleets. The Muslims also had no knowledge of sailing or navigation, so they manned their Egyptian fleet with Coptic Christian sailors and their Persian fleet with mercenaries having Byzantine naval backgrounds. In Carthage, the Muslim “governor of Egypt sent 1,000 Coptic shipwrights…to construct a fleet of 100 warships.”

Muslim fleets continued to be designed, built, and sailed by Christians for centuries, even into the early modern period. During the battle of Lepanto, “the leading captains of both fleets were European. The sultan himself preferred renegade Italian admirals.” Not only were Muslim ships copies of European designs; “they were built for the sultan by highly paid runaways,” by “shipwrights from Naples and Venice.”

== Role of Christianity in science in the medieval Islamic world ==
Christians, especially Nestorians, contributed to the Arab Islamic Civilization during the Umayyads and the Abbasids by translating works of Greek philosophers to Syriac and afterwards to Arabic. They also excelled in philosophy, science (such as Hunayn ibn Ishaq, Qusta ibn Luqa, Masawaiyh, Patriarch Eutychius, Jabril ibn Bukhtishu etc.) and theology (such as Tatian, Bar Daisan, Babai the Great, Nestorius, Toma bar Yacoub etc.) and the personal physicians of the Abbasid Caliphs were often Assyrian Christians such as the long serving Bukhtishu dynasty.

When Arabs and Islam arrived in the levant and Mesopotamia, they encountered 600 years of Assyrian Christian civilization, with a rich heritage, a highly developed culture, and advanced learning institutions. It is this Christian Civilization that became one of the great influencers and foundations of Islamic Civilization. The book "How Greek Science Passed to the Arabs" gives a list of the best known scholars of the Abbasid caliphate's Golden Age. Out of theses 22 scholars, 20 were Christians (Assyrians), 1 was Persian (Zoroastrian) and 1 was Muslim.

It was a Christian scholar and Bishop from Nisibis named Severus Sebokht who was the first to describe and incorporate indian mathematical symbols in the mid 7th century, which were then adopted into Islamic culture and are now known as the Arabic numerals. Famous Persian polymath al-Khwarizmi followed in the pioneering footsteps of Diophantus of Alexandria.

Ibn Khaldun pointed out that the one civilization from which the Arabs had learned the sciences, was that of the Greeks, thanks to the translations by Christian scholars of Greek texts into Syriac and then into Arabic. Ibn Khaldun also records that Abbasid caliph al-Mansur requested from the Byzantine Emperor the mathematical works of the Greeks.

=== Role of Christianity in medicine in the medieval Islamic world ===
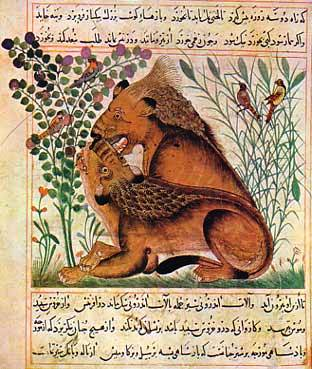
Ibn Bakhtishu's Manafi' al-Hayawan (منافع الحيوان), dated 12th century. Captions appear in Persian.

The field of Islamic Medicine owes its origins to two Christians, Masawaiyh and Hunayn ibn Ishaq. The Nestorian Christian, Yahya ibn Masawayh, wrote many works on fevers, hygiene, and dietetics. Masawaiyh, served six caliphs as a physician, wrote 44 original works and translated many Greek medical works into Arabic, and was made the first head of the House of Wisdom by the Abbasid caliph al-Ma'mun. His was the first treatise on ophthalmology, but he was soon surpassed in this field by his famous pupil, Hunayn ibn Ishaq (aka Johannitius), whom some regard as the father of Arab medicine. Razi, the physician of genius known in medieval Europe as Rhazes, profited greatly from the works started by Hunayn ibn Ishaq. The Assyrian Christian named Stephanos translated the work of Greek physician Pedanius Dioscorides into the Arabic language, and for over a century, this translated medical text was used by the Muslim states.

For 200 years the Bukhtishu family, Assyrian Christians, were the physicians to the Caliphs of Baghdad and they founded the great medical school at Gundeshapur in Iran. When Abbasid Caliph al-Mansur became ill and no physician in Baghdad could cure him, he sent for the dean of the medical school in Gundeshapur, which was renowned as the best of its time. Many of them used their position in the Caliphs court to influence events and further the interests of their church and Christian community. They became advisors as well as confidential friends to many Caliphs. The first to see and greet Caliph Harun al-Rashid in the morning was his personal physician named Jabril ibn Bukhtishu, and when the fact that he was only a dhimmi caused jealousy, the caliph said: "But I owe my good health to him, and since the well being of the Muslims is dependent on me, their well-being is dependent on Jabril."

The number of Christian doctors in the Abbasid Caliphate was very large. Many of them wrote original works in medicine and translated medical works into Arabic. As a result of this they earned a special importance within Baghdadi society and acquired a particular prestige. The Muslim Physician Asad ibn Jani explained to the theologian al-Jahiz why he had no work despite an epidemic happening in the Abbasid Caliphate:

This is a plague year and disease has reached epidemic proportions. you are a doctor with knowledge, skill, and expertise, so why do you have no work?’ He answered: ‘First of all I am a Muslim, and long before I started practicing medicine, in fact, long before I was even born, people have believed that Muslims do not make good doctors. Second, my name is Asad and it should have been Salib or Gabriel, Peter or John. Third my surname is Abu Harith and it should have been Jesus, Zachariah, or Abraham. Fourth I wear a white cotton overcoat and it should have been of black silk. Finally my language should have been that of Gundeshapur [Syriac].

Leading Muslim physicians were trained at Nestorian medical center at Nisibis. School of Nisibis offered not only medicine but the full range of advanced education, as did the other institutions of learning the Nestorian Christians established, including the one at Gundeshapur in Iran, which the distinguished historian George Sarton called “the greatest intellectual center of the time.”

A hospital and medical training center existed at Gundeshapur. The city of Gundeshapur was founded in 271 by the Sassanid king Shapur I. It was one of the major cities in Khuzestan province of the Persian empire in what is today Iran. A large percentage of the population were Nestorian Christians, all of whom were exiled by the Byzantine Emperor Zeno (c. 425–491) in accordance with the doctrines of the Trinity which was established in the first Council of Nicea.

Under the rule of Khosrau I, refuge was granted to the Greek, and the Nestorian Christian philosophers including the scholars of the Persian School of Edessa (Urfa). Many neoplatonic scholars made their way to Gundeshapur in 529 following the closing of the academy of Athens by Emperor Justinian I. They were engaged in medical sciences and initiated the first translation projects of medical texts. The arrival of these medical practitioners from Edessa marks the beginning of the hospital and medical center at Gundeshapur. It included a medical school and hospital (bimaristan), a pharmacology laboratory, a translation house, a library and an observatory. Indian doctors also contributed to the school at Gundeshapur, most notably the medical researcher Mankah. After the Muslim conquest of Persia, much of the region's study and literature were translated into Arabic at Baghdad.

An author observed that “The fourth Umayyad Caliph, Marwan I, ordered the translation … of the famous medical treatise of Aaron of Alexandria. The translation of medical literature was in fact a principal aspect of the scientific progress that distinguished the rule of the Umayyads.”

Early Islamic medical institutions were likely generally inspired by the precedent of poor and sick relief services offered at Christian monasteries and other ecclesiastical establishments.

The oldest scientific work in Arabic was a discourse on medicine, which was written by Aaron of Alexandria, a greek christian priest and translated from the Syriac language then into Arabic in the year 683 by a Jewish doctor from Basra named Masarjawaih.

Under the first Abbasids, medicine was taught in the Aramaic language. Ibn Bakhtishu, a Nestorian christian physician in Baghdad established the first hospital in the islamic world under the orders of Harun al rashid, where his son (d. 801) became the leading practitioner. Yuhanna ibn Masawayh, a Jacobite christian physician, translator, and ophthalmologist, wrote the first treatise on ophthalmology in Arabic.

Immense scientific knowledge, (such as Galenic medical knowledge), fell into the hands of Muslims after their military conquest of the Christian city of Alexandria in the year 642. Muslim physicians would build upon these Greek works for their later reputation in the medical field.

=== Astronomy ===
After the destruction of the Constantinople observatory of Taqi al-Din in 1580, astronomical activity stagnated in the Ottoman Empire, until the introduction of Copernican heliocentrism in 1660, when the Ottoman scholar Ibrahim Efendi al-Zigetvari Tezkireci translated Noël Duret's French astronomical work (written in 1637) into Arabic.

== Hispania (Al-Andalus) ==
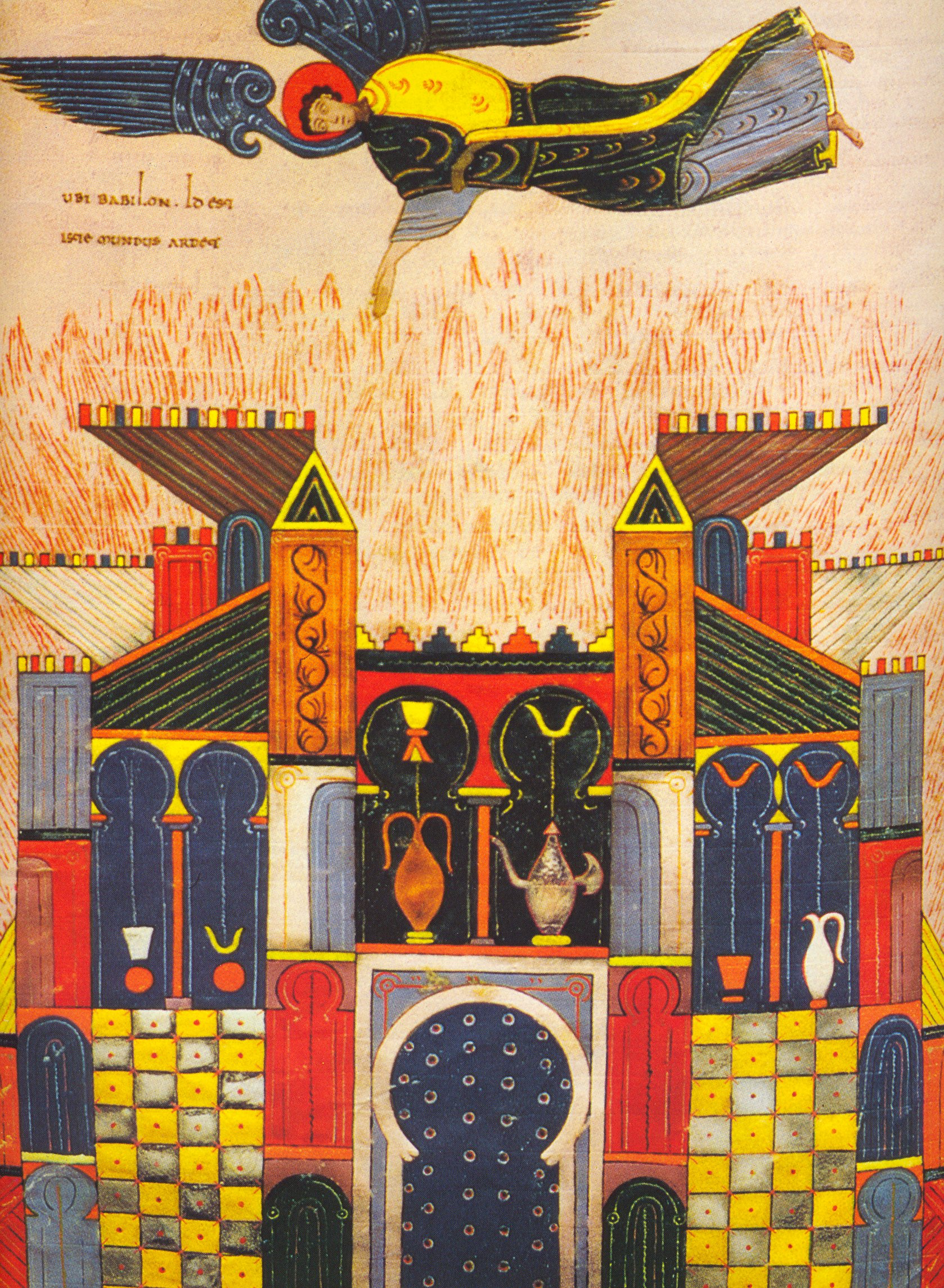
Beatus of Facundus: Judgment of Babylon; Mozarabic period.

Historian Pavón Maldonado says that “Spanish-Muslim art derives in large part from Roman, paleo-Christian, Byzantine, and Visigoth art.” Muslims adopted the Visigoth horseshoe arch, seen in many Islamic buildings. The Mosque-Cathedral of Cordoba was built over the former Church of Saint Vincent (which was demolished and its parts used to build the Mosque). Darío Fernández-Morera says:

The Islamic conquerors used the church of Saint Vincent’s main facade for the facade of their mosque. They also cannibalized columns and other building materials from Hispano-Roman and Visigoth churches. They adopted a Roman technique (opus vittatum mixtum) in alternating red brick and white stone in the arches; that alternating pattern is still visible today in some Roman aqueducts of Spain, such as the Acueducto de los Milagros in Mérida. The mosque’s horseshoe arches imitated Greek Roman arches and Visigoth arches. Finally, the mosque’s mosaics were of Greek manufacture.

In the year 948 the Byzantine emperor gave the works of Pedanius Dioscorides to Caliph Abd al-Rahman III of Córdoba in the original Greek. But they didn't know how to speak Greek so the emperor also sent a Greek monk, who instructed the Caliph's slaves in Greek.

The Caliph of Cordoba Al-Hakam II requested that the Byzantine Emperor Nikephoros II Phokas send Greek specialists in mosaics to supervise the decoration of the Mosque-Cathedral of Cordoba.

Spanish historian Julio Samsó has shown that, even as late as the eleventh century, Muslim scholars in al-Andalus were still adopting the science of the Greco-Roman classics as well as that of the Latin culture of the native Christian dhimmis of Al-Andalus (who were called “Mozarabs”)

Reinhardt Dozy observed that many Muslim scientists in Al-Andalus, such as the physician Arib Ibn Said, came from formerly Christian families or were outright converts.

According to Ibn Khaldun, the famous classic Arabic poetic form called muwassaha (or Moachaha) was invented in the ninth century by a poet of Christian dhimmi ancestry named Muccadam de Cabra. And the popular poetry of the Christian dhimmis, in Mozarabic Romance became part of this muwassaha in the jarchas (verses found at the end of the muwassahas). Some of these jarchas are in Mozarabic Romance, written in Arabic (and sometimes Hebrew) script, and showing the persistence of a spoken Spanish Romance among Christian dhimmis.

The Mozarabs; Christian communities that remained in al-Andalus after the Islamic conquest, formed one of the most significant non-Muslim populations in the region, with major centers in Córdoba, Seville, and Toledo. They comprised both an upper class of prominent Christian notables and a larger lower class that, following the conquest, gained new economic rights, including the ability to cultivate land in exchange for a modest share of its produce owed to the state. Over time, the Mozarabs adopted Arabic language and culture, excelled in Arabic literary forms, and played a crucial role throughout the Umayyad period, during which the Umayyads relied on them for administering economic affairs, organizing state structures, and contributing to scholarly activity. Christians in al-Andalus were particularly distinguished in the sciences, medicine, and astronomy, while the broader Christian populace engaged primarily in agriculture, livestock raising, and fishing.

== Iran ==
Professor Dario Fernandez Morera says:

As Robert M. Haddad, Aptin Khanbaghi, Louis Milliot, and other scholars have noticed, the Christian dhimmis served as an intermediary between the more primitive societies of the Islamic invaders and the highly Cultured civilizations of the Christian Roman Empire and the Zoroastrian Persian Empire. The Persian Muslim chronicler Ibn al-Nadim testified that “in tenth-century Iran, the majority of philosophers were still Christian."

The Persian poet Nur ad-Din Abd ar-Rahman Jami claimed that his rapidly failing vision was saved “with the aid of Frankish glasses.”

=== Christian merchants and the silk trade ===
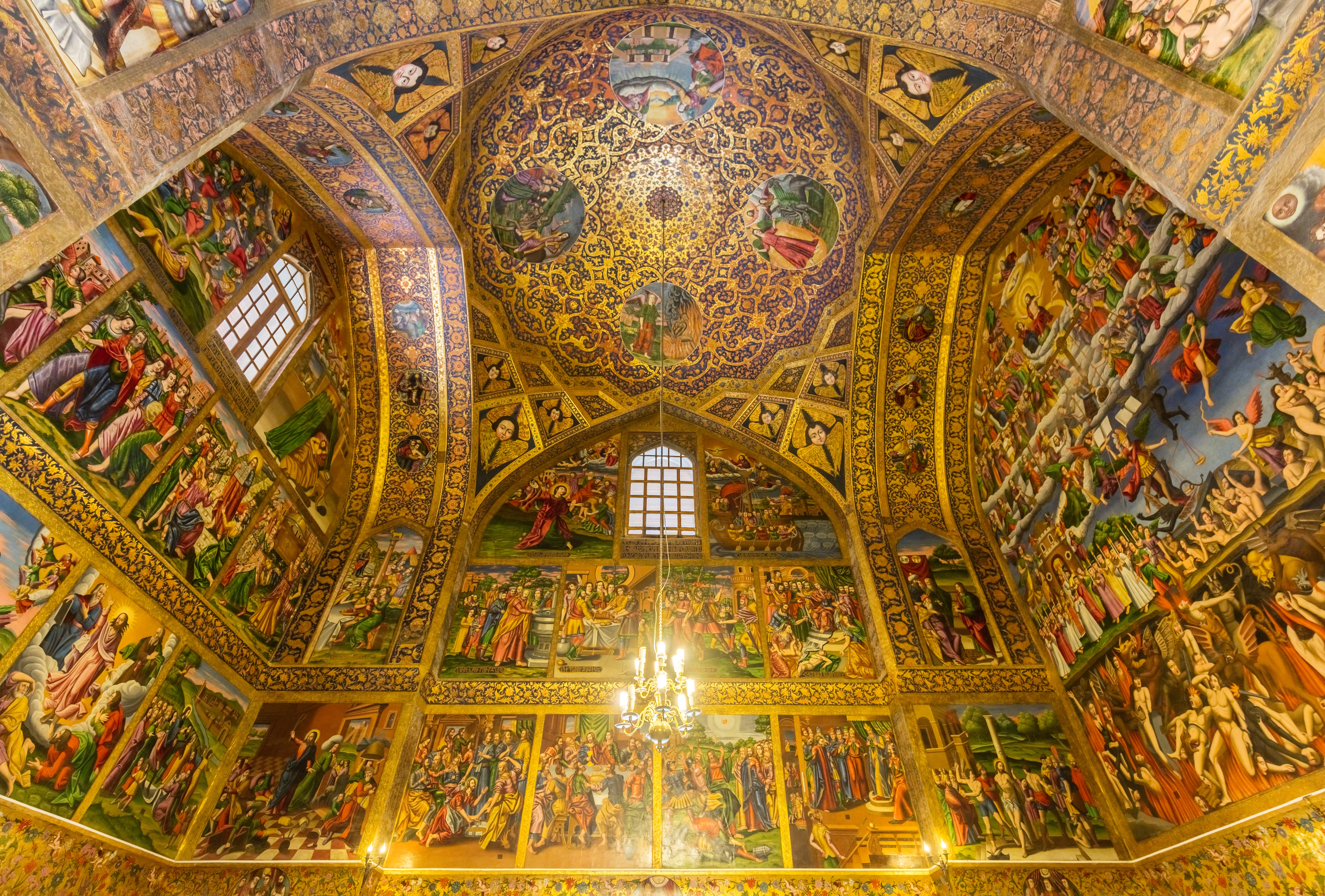
The Vank Cathedral. The Armenians moved into the Jolfa district of Isfahan and were free to build their prayer houses, eventually becoming an integral part of the society.

The one valuable item, sought for in Europe, which Iran possessed and which could bring in silver in sufficient quantities was silk, which was produced in the northern provinces, along the Caspian coastline. The trade of this product was done by Persians to begin with, but during the 17th century the Christian Armenians became increasingly vital in the trade of this merchandise, as middlemen.

Whereas domestic trade was largely in the hands of Persian and Jewish merchants, by the late 17th century, almost all foreign trade was controlled by the Armenians. They were even hired by wealthy Persian merchants to travel to Europe when they wanted to create commercial bases there, and the Armenians eventually established themselves in cities like Bursa, Aleppo, Venice, Livorno, Marseilles and Amsterdam. Realizing this, Shah Abbas resettled large numbers of Armenians from the Caucasus to his capital city and provided them with loans. As the shah realized the importance of doing trade with the Europeans, he assured that the Safavid society was one with religious tolerance. The Christian Armenians thus became a commercial elite in the Safavid society and managed to survive in the tough atmosphere of business being fought over by the British, Dutch, French, Indians and Persians, by always having large capital readily available and by managing to strike harder bargains ensuring cheaper prices than what, for instance, their British rivals ever were able to.

=== Twentieth century up to 1979 ===
The Christian Armenians played a significant role in the development of 20th-century Iran, regarding both its economical as well as its cultural configuration. They were pioneers in photography, theater, and the film industry, and also played a very pivotal role in Iranian political affairs.

The modernization efforts of Reza Shah (1924–1941) and Mohammad Reza Shah (1941–1979) gave the Armenians ample opportunities for advancement, and Armenians gained important positions in the arts and sciences, economy and services sectors, mainly in Tehran, Tabriz, and Isfahan that became major centers for Armenians. From 1946–1949 about 20,000 Armenians left Iran for the Soviet Union and from 1962–1982 another 25,000 Armenians followed them to Soviet Armenia.

== Ottoman Empire ==
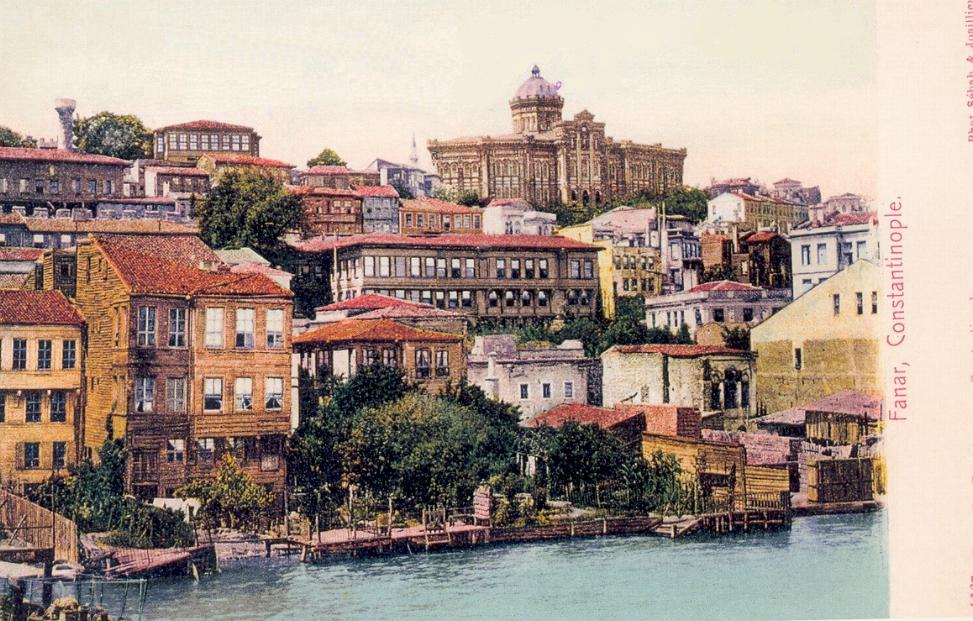
View of the Phanarion quarter, the historical centre of the Greek community of Constantinople in Ottoman times, c. 1900

Immediately after the Conquest of Constantinople, Mehmet II released his portion of the city's captive Christian population with instructions to start the rebuilding of Constantinople which had been devastated by siege and war. Afterwards, he begin to also repopulate the city bringing new inhabitants – both Christian and Muslim – from the whole empire and from the newly conquered territories. Phanar was then repopulated with Greeks deported from Mouchlion in the Peloponnese and, after 1461, with citizens of Trebizond.

The roots of Greek ascendancy can be traced to the need of the Ottomans for skilled and educated negotiators as the power of their empire declined and they were compelled to rely on treaties more than the force of arms. From the 17th century onwards the Ottomans began facing problems in the conduct of their foreign relations, and were having difficulties in dictating terms to their neighbours; the Porte was faced for the first time with the need of participating in diplomatic negotiations. From 1669 until the Greek War of Independence in 1821, Phanariots made up the majority of the dragomans to the Ottoman government (the Porte) and foreign embassies due to the Greeks' higher level of education than the general Ottoman population. The roots of Greek success in the Ottoman Empire can be traced to the Greek tradition of education and commerce exemplified in the Phanariotes. It was the wealth of the extensive merchant class that provided the material basis for the intellectual revival that was the prominent feature of Greek life in the half century and more leading to the outbreak of the Greek War of Independence in 1821. Not coincidentally, on the eve of 1821, the three most important centres of Greek learning were situated in Chios, Smyrna and Aivali, all three major centres of Greek commerce. Greek success was also favoured by Greek domination in the leadership of the Eastern Orthodox church.

Given the Ottoman tradition of generally ignoring Western European languages and cultures, officials found themselves unable to handle such affairs. The Porte subsequently assigned those tasks to the Greeks who had a long mercantile and educational tradition and could provide the necessary skills. As a result, the so−called Phanariotes, Greek and Hellenized families mostly native to Constantinople, came to occupy high posts of secretaries and interpreters to Ottoman officials and officers.

The Armenians in the Ottoman Empire were made up of three religious denominations: Armenian Catholic, Armenian Protestant, and Armenian Apostolic, the Church of the vast majority of Armenians. The wealthy, Constantinople-based Amira class, a social elite whose members included the Duzians (Directors of the Imperial Mint), the Balyans (Chief Imperial Architects) and the Dadians (Superintendent of the Gunpowder Mills and manager of industrial factories).

== The Mashriq ==
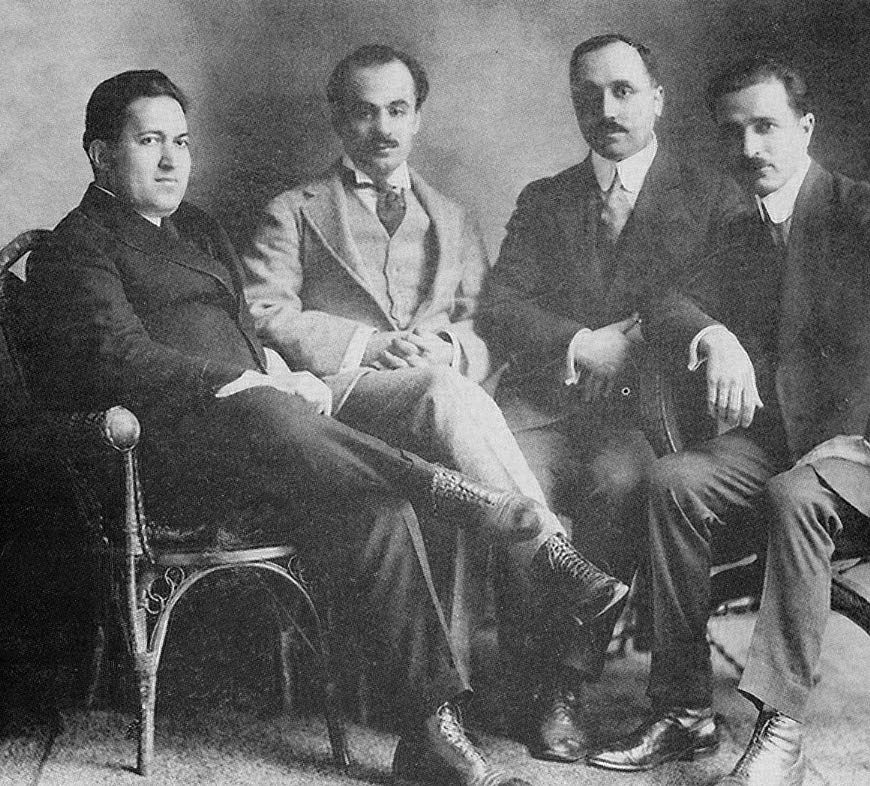
A 1920 photograph of four prominent members of The Pen League (from left to right): Nasib Arida, Kahlil Gibran, Abd al-Masih Haddad, and Mikhail Naimy.

Scholars and intellectuals including Palestinian-American Edward Said affirm that Christians in the Arab world have made significant contributions to the Arab civilization since the introduction of Islam. The top poets in history were Arab Christians, and many Arab Christians are physicians, philosophers, government officials and people of literature. Arab Christians traditionally formed the educated upper class and they have had a significant impact in the culture of the Mashriq. Some of the most influential Arab nationalists were Arab Christians, like George Habash, founder of the Popular Front for the Liberation of Palestine, and Syrian intellectual Constantin Zureiq. Many Palestinian Christians were also active in the formation and governing of the Palestinian National Authority since 1992. The suicide bomber Jules Jammal, a Syrian military officer who blew himself up while ramming a French ship, was also an Arab Christian. While Lebanese Maronite Christian were among the Masters and Fathers of the Arabic Renaissance Al-Nahda.

Because Arab Christians formed the educated class, they had a significant impact on the politics and culture of the Arab World. Christian colleges like Saint Joseph University and American University of Beirut (Syrian Protestant College until 1920) thrived in Lebanon, Al-Hikma University in Baghdad amongst others played leading role in the development of civilization and Arab culture. Given this role in politics and culture, Ottoman ministers began to include them in their governments. In the economic sphere, a number of Christian families like Sursock became prominent. Thus, the Nahda led the Muslims and Christians to a cultural renaissance and national general despotism. This solidified Arab Christians as one of the pillars of the region and not a minority on the fringes.

Today Middle Eastern Christians are relatively wealthy, well educated, and politically moderate, as they have today an active role in various social, economical, sporting and political aspects in the Middle East. Arab Christians have significantly influenced and contributed to the Arabic culture in many fields both historically and in modern times, including literature, politics, business, philosophy, music, theatre and cinema, medicine, and science.

== Egypt ==
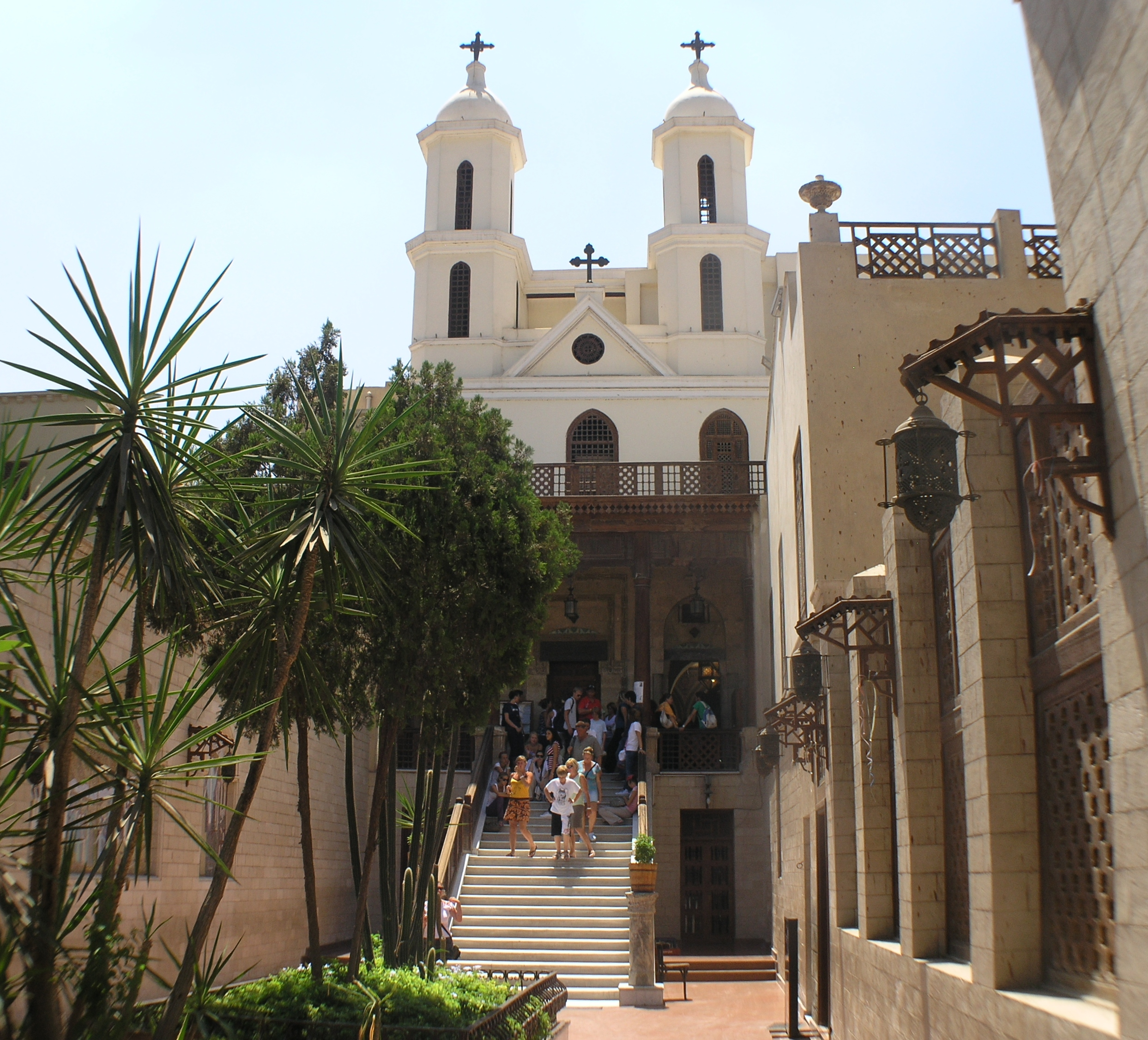
The Hanging Church, Cairo.

Under Islamic rule, the Copts held important administrative and commercial positions. To advance socially and economically, they often adopted the Arabic language and culture. This trend of assimilation became particularly prominent during the Fatimid period. Copts also played a pivotal role in the Arab Renaissance and the modernization of Egypt and the broader Arab world. Their contributions extended to Egypt's social and political spheres, including influential debates on pan-Arabism, governance, educational reform, and democracy. Historically, Copts have been successful in business, maintaining prominence in commerce. Even into modern times, the Coptic community has remained a significant force in Egypt. During the British protectorate, two Copts served as prime ministers, and many continued to own large landholdings and prosperous businesses. However, the 1952 revolution led by Gamal Abdel Nasser marked a shift. His government’s reforms disproportionately impacted the upper- and middle-class Copts, leading to a decline in the community's social standing and sparking a wave of emigration.

Throughout the 19th and early 20th centuries, Copts held significant roles in Egypt’s financial and administrative sectors. They were widely employed as accountants in government offices, and by the 1960s reportedly owned 51% of the country’s banking institutions. In the mid-20th century, Christians were estimated to represent 45% of Egypt’s medical doctors and 60% of its pharmacists. Several Coptic families have attained significant economic influence, particularly in the private sector. The Sawiris family, through its Orascom conglomerate, became one of Egypt’s most prominent business dynasties in the early 2000s, with interests spanning telecommunications, construction, tourism, and technology. In 2008, Forbes estimated their combined wealth at $36 billion.

Some scholars attribute the high educational and economic profile of the Coptic community to a historical emphasis within the Coptic community on literacy and the development of human capital.

== The Maghreb ==
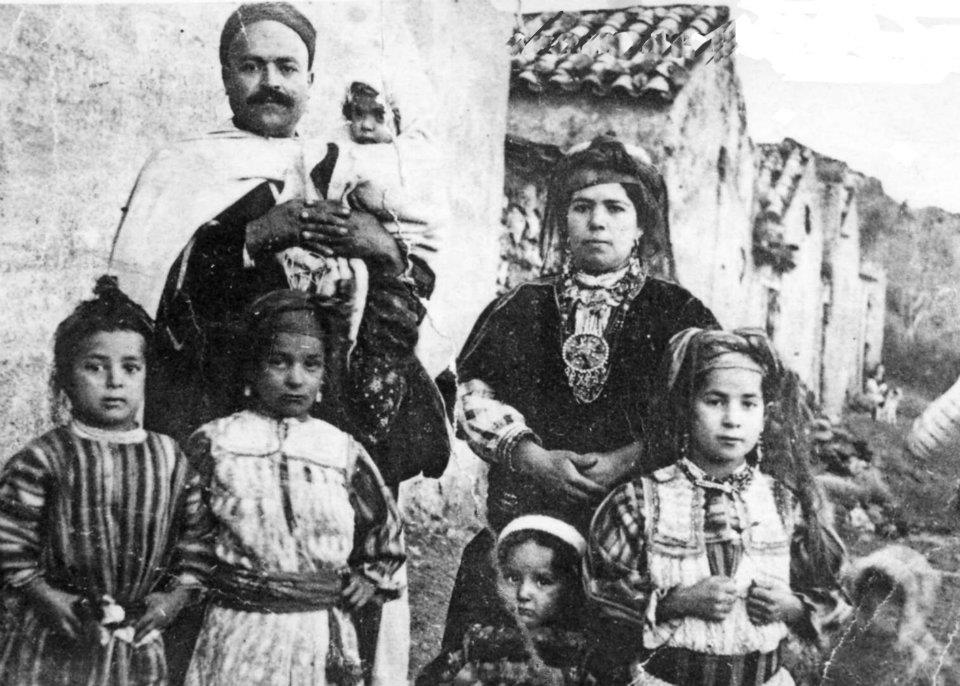
Christian Berber family from Kabylia.

In the centuries following the Islamic conquest of the Maghreb, some remote regions continued to host small Christian communities. Contemporary scholarship, based on various pieces of evidence, suggests that Christianity among the indigenous peoples of the Maghreb persisted for several centuries after the Islamic conquest, across the region stretching from Tripoli to Morocco for several centuries after the Islamic conquest. Muslims and Christians are believed to have lived side by side in the Maghreb throughout this period. Archaeological finds include Christian relics dating back to the year 1114 CE in central Algeria. It has also been found that the tombs of certain saints on the outskirts of Carthage continued to be sites of pilgrimage and visitation well beyond the year 850 CE. This indicates that Christianity likely persisted in North Africa at least until the Almoravid and Almohad periods. Many Christians reached prominent social status, becoming influential and respected figures, and enjoyed the protection of the state—especially during the reign of Ali ibn Yusuf. One Christian document even claimed that his fondness for Christians surpassed his concern for his own subjects, granting them gold and silver and housing them in palaces. Christians also shared access to public facilities with Muslims; they were allowed to draw water from the same wells. Due to the religious tolerance shown toward them, Christians were even permitted to join Muslims in the prayer for rain (Salat al-Istisqa).

In the 19th century, Tunisia witnessed the reemergence of a local Christian community, primarily composed of people of foreign descent—namely the children and grandchildren of European immigrants, most of whom were of Italian and Maltese origin. One of the most prominent figures from this social group was Giuseppe Raffo, who served as Minister of Foreign Affairs under the Kingdom of Tunisia during the reign of Ahmad I ibn Mustafa.

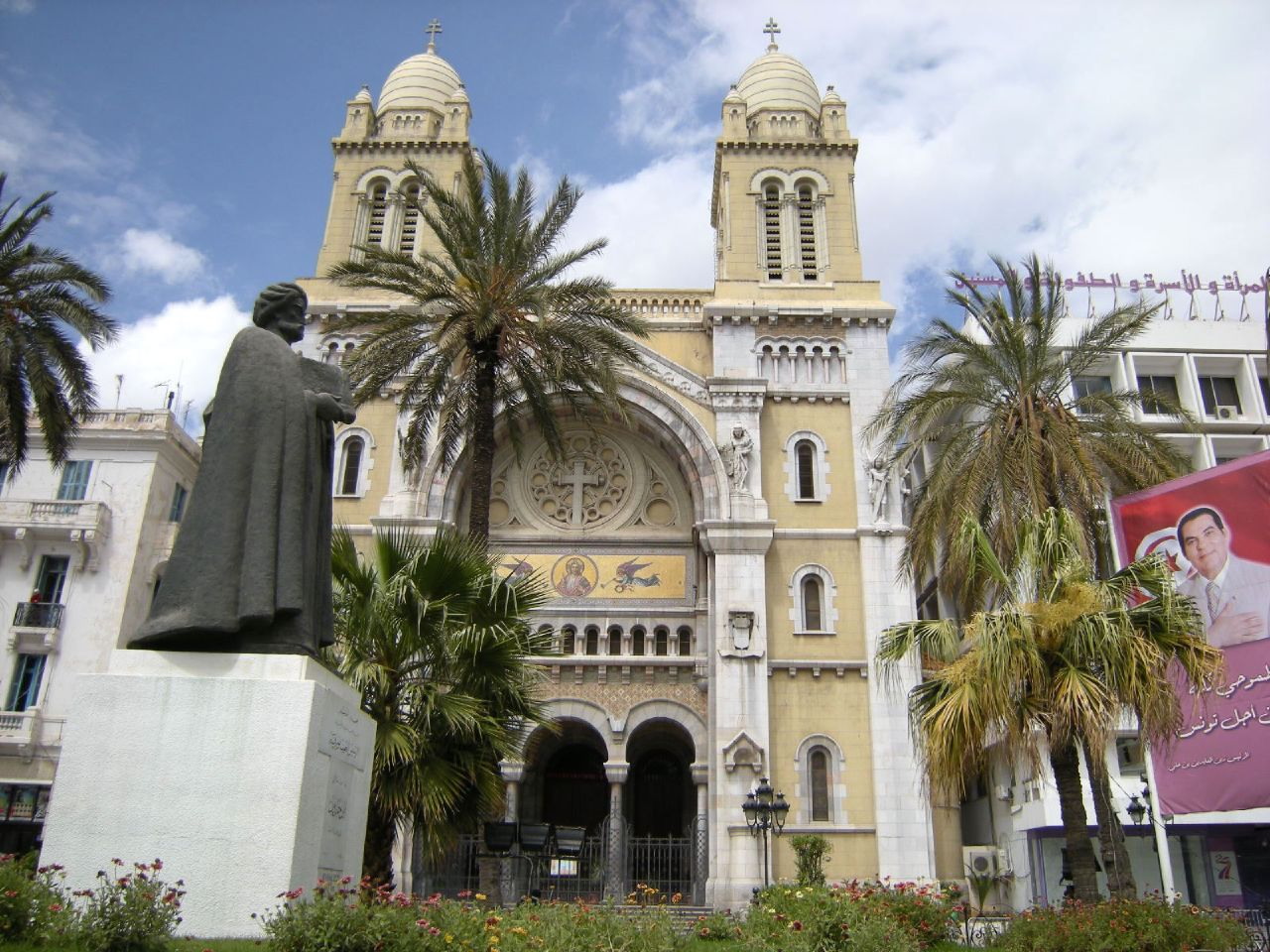
Cathedral of Saint Vincent de Paul in Tunis.

With the revival of Christianity in the Maghreb during the 19th century, the number of Christian converts among the Berbers began to rise, especially during and after the French colonial period. Before independence, Algeria was home to 1.4 million pieds-noirs (mostly Catholic), Morocco had around half a million Christians, Tunisia hosted 255,000 Christians settlers, and Libya had about 145,000. These European Catholic settlers left a lasting legacy and held a significant presence across the Maghreb.

With the strong growth of the Amazigh Christian population and the local church in the Maghreb, the Christian community—particularly those of Kabyle and Rif Amazigh descent—began to influence the surrounding culture, especially in music, literature, and politics. Prominent Christian figures from the Maghreb region include Taos Amrouche, the first Algerian woman to publish a novel; Jean Amrouche, an Algerian Francophone writer, poet, and journalist; Fadhma Aït Mansour, an Algerian poet and folk singer; Malika Oufkir, a Moroccan writer; Lucien-Samir Oulahbib, a sociologist, political scientist, writer, and journalist of Berber Christian origin; and Amokrane Ould Aoudia, a lawyer and political activist associated with the Algerian Communist Party (PCA) in Algiers.

== Statistics ==
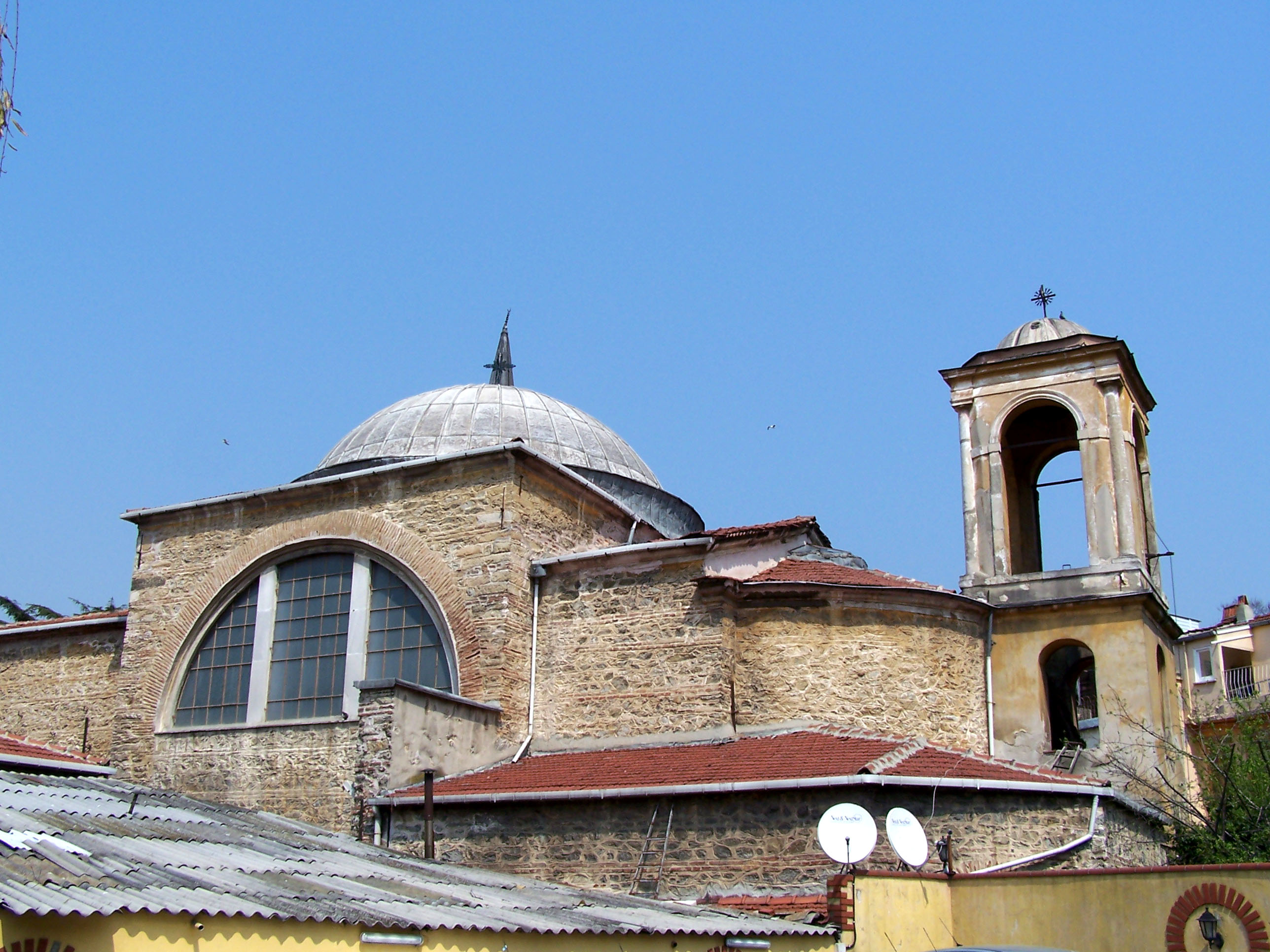
Church and Mosque in Istanbul, Turkey.

According to the Pew Research Center, the Christian population in the 53 Muslim-majority countries was approximately 168 million in 2020, or around 75 million when Nigeria is excluded. In 2010, the figure stood at about 140 million, or 64 million without Nigeria.

Christian numbers declined between 2010 and 2020 in parts of Muslim-majority countries in the Middle East, North Africa, Central Asia, Balkans, and the Caucasus due to large-scale Christian emigration, while Gulf Cooperation Council states saw notable increases driven by Christian migrant workers. In 2020, Christians in the Muslim world were concentrated mainly in Sub-Saharan Africa (112 million including Nigeria; 19.3 million without it), followed by Southeast Asia (31.3 million), North Africa (up to 8.3 million), the Middle East excluding Egypt (up to 7.7 million), Central Asia and the Caucasus (about 5.6 million), South Asia (3.5 million), and lastly the Balkans (2.2 million).

The Muslim world is home to some of the world's most ancient Christian communities, and some of the most important cities of the Christian world—including three of its five great patriarchates (Alexandria, Antioch, and Constantinople). In many Muslim-majority states, Christians have personal-status laws based on canon laws, official holidays for major feasts, and varying degrees of political representation.In some of these countries, a number of historic Christian patriarchates are also hosted, among them the Coptic Orthodox Church, the Greek Orthodox Patriarchate of Antioch, the Maronite Church, the Chaldean Catholic Church, the Melkite Greek Catholic Church, the Syriac Orthodox Church, the Assyrian Church of the East, and the Ecumenical Patriarchate of Constantinople, and Christians continue to contribute to their political and cultural life.

Christian population in the Muslim world (2010–20) per Pew Research Center
| Country | Christian count | |
| Country | 2010 | 2020 |
|---|---|---|
| Nigeria | 73,980,000 | 92,770,000 |
| Indonesia | 24,330,000 | 28,200,000 |
| Egypt | 4,540,000 - 8,000,000 | 5,270,000 - 8,000,000 |
| Chad | 4,870,000 | 6,700,000 |
| Burkina Faso | 4,300,000 | 6,100,000 |
| Kazakhstan | 4,600,000 | 3,760,000 |
| Malaysia | 2,650,000 | 3,100,000 |
| Pakistan | 2,960,000 | 2,990,000 |
| Lebanon | 1,710,000 | 1,590,000 |
| Sierra Leone | 1,130,000 | 1,570,000 |
| Guinea | 880,000 | 1,570,000 |
| Eritrea | 1,390,000 | 1,540,000 |
| Bosnia-Herzegovina | 1,770,000 | 1,470,000 |
| Saudi Arabia | 840,000 | 1,360,000 |
| United Arab Emirates | 912,800 | 1,350,000 |
| Uzbekistan | 953,000 | 932,100 |
| Syria | 1,930,000 | 810,000 |
| Mali | 550,000 | 560,000 |
| Albania | 594,000 | 511,700 |
| Bangladesh | 460,000 | 500,000 |
| Kuwait | 280,000 | 460,000 |
| Guinea-Bissau | 410,000 | 440,000 |
| Senegal | 400,000 | 430,000 |
| Turkmenistan | 350,000 | 390,000 |
| Kyrgyzstan | 420,000 | 380,000 |
| Oman | 120,000 | 370,000 |
| Qatar | 230,000 | 350,000 |
| Turkey | 480,000 | 320,000 |
| Jordan | 240,000 | 310,000 |
| Iran | 120,000 - 300,000 | 130,000 - 300,000 |
| Kosovo | 110,000 | 240,000 |
| Sudan | 60,000 | 230,000 |
| Bahrain | 190,000 | 200,000 |
| Algeria | 110,000 | 130,000 - 200,000 |
| Niger | 130,000 | 180,000 |
| Iraq | 200,000 | 160,000 |
| Azerbaijan | 150,000 | 42,700 - 160,000 |
| Tajikistan | 80,000 | 100,000 |
| Morocco | 50,000 | 100,000 |
| Gambia | 80,000 | 70,000 |
| Palestine | 50,000 | 50,000 |
| Libya | 170,000 | 40,000 |
| Tunisia | 20,000 | 30,000 - 35,000 |
| Brunei | 30,000 | 30,000 |
| Yemen | 30,000 - 41,000 | 20,100 |
| Afghanistan | 30,000 | 10,000 - 12,000 |
| Djibouti | 12,200 | 12,500 |
| Mauritania | <10,000 | 10,800 |
| Comoros | <10,000 | 10,000 |
| Mayotte | <10,000 | 9,000 |
| Northern Cyprus | 1,400 | 1,400 |
| Maldives | <1,000 | 1,400 |
| Somalia | 1,000 | 1,000 |
| Western Sahara | 200 | 260 |
| Total | 139,904,600 | 167,872,960 |

== See also ==
- Isra'iliyyat, Judaism-related influences on Islam
- List of Christian scientists and scholars of the medieval Islamic world
