= Yuhanna ibn Bukhtishu =

Persian physician

Yuhanna ibn Bukhtishu (Johannes Bukhtishu) was a 9th-century Persian or Syriac physician from Khuzestan, Persia.

Yuhanna ibn Bukhtishu‘ (or Bakhtishu‘) was a member of a prominent family of Church of the East Christian physicians originally from Jundishapur in Khuzastan who worked in Baghdad from the 8th through the 10th centuries. The name is composite of middle Persian Bukht (saved) and Syriac Ishu' (Jesus), which means saved by Jesus or one whose saviour is Jesus.

Yuhanna ibn Bukhtishu was the illegitimate son of Jabril Ibn Bukhtishu (d. 870CE) who was physician to the caliphs al-Ma'mun, al-Wathiq and Al-Mutawakkil in Baghdad.

Ibn Bukhtishu‘, who worked in Baghdad about 892CE, is known to have written a treatise on astrological knowledge necessary for a physician, but the treatise is now lost. It is uncertain whether he was in fact the author of a treatise on materia medica that is attributed to him in the extant copies, of which The National Library of Medicine has one.

== See also ==
- List of Iranian scientists
- Bukhtishu, Abdollah ibn.
- Bukhtishu, Gabriel ibn.
- Bukhtishu
