= Kitāb naʿt al-ḥayawān =

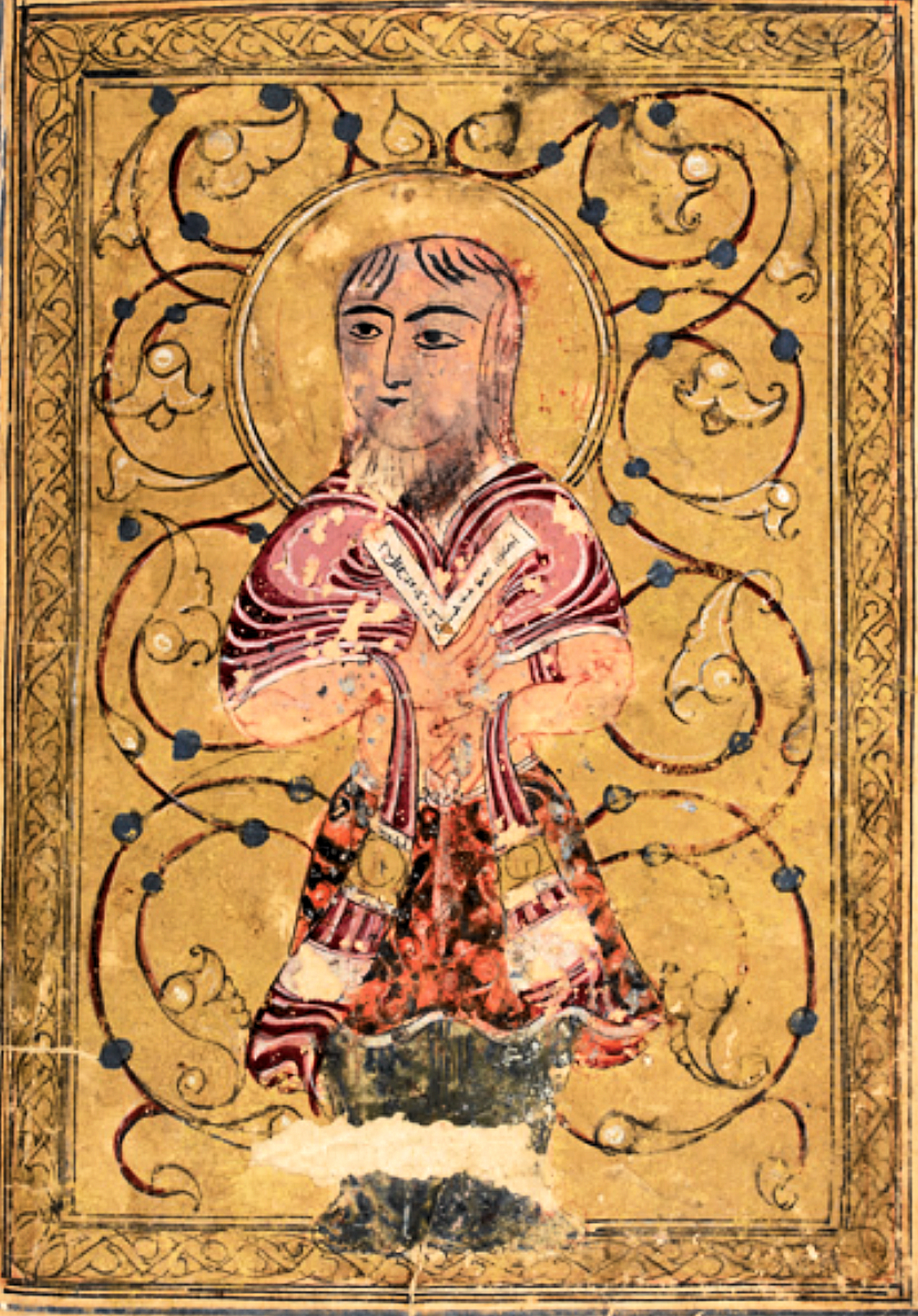
- Frontispiece 1: compiler of the manuscript, holding a volume in his hands. Ibn Bakhtīshūʿ, Kitāb naʿt al-ḥayawān, probably Baghdad, c. 1225. London, British Library, Or. 2784, fol. 1v (2v)
- Author: Ibn Bakhtīshūʿ
- Original title: كتاب نعت الحيوان
- Language: Arabic
- Subject: Characteristics and medical uses of animals
- Genre: Bestiary
- Published: 13th century
- Media type: Manuscript

Kitāb naʿt al-ḥayawān, sometimes abbreviated Na't (“Book of the Characteristics of Animals”), is a 13th-century manuscript in the tradition of the Nestorian Christian author Ibn Bakhtīshūʿ (980–1058). The manuscript is in the British Library (Or. 2784). It is the earliest illustrated manuscripts on animals, among known Arab and Persian manuscripts.

It is a work of the Abbasid period circa 1225, probably from Baghdad, but the exact date or place of production, or the author (painter and calligrapher) of this specific manuscript are unknown.

The compiler of the book describes his intentions:

The compiler ( jāmiʿ) of this book says: when I read what the sage Aristotle said in his book on the characteristics of animals and found that he had not mentioned their usefulness I wanted to [add what has been mentioned by the sage ʿUbayd Allāh ibn Jibrāʾīl i]bn Bakhtīshūʿ on the usefulness of animals to make this book complete. I began it with the book by Aristotle and I [finished] it with the book by Ibn Bakhtīshūʿ. Everything quoted from Aristotle is Naʿt and everything quoted from Ibn Bakhtīshūʿ is Manfaʿ.

— Kitāb naʿt al-ḥayawān.

Figures of authority are presented in frontispiece 3 and 4, a "Ruler-Prince" with armed attendants and a "Scholar-Prince". The attendants of the "Ruler-Prince" are armed and dressed with elements of the Turkic military fashion, wearing a type of Turkic sharbush headgear and boots. These elements help distinguish the "official" garb from the "Arab" garb, as also seen in the Maqamat al-Hariri manuscripts. One attendant in frontispiece 4 is in non-military “Arab” dress, with a turban, a long tunic with baggy white trousers and black slippers.

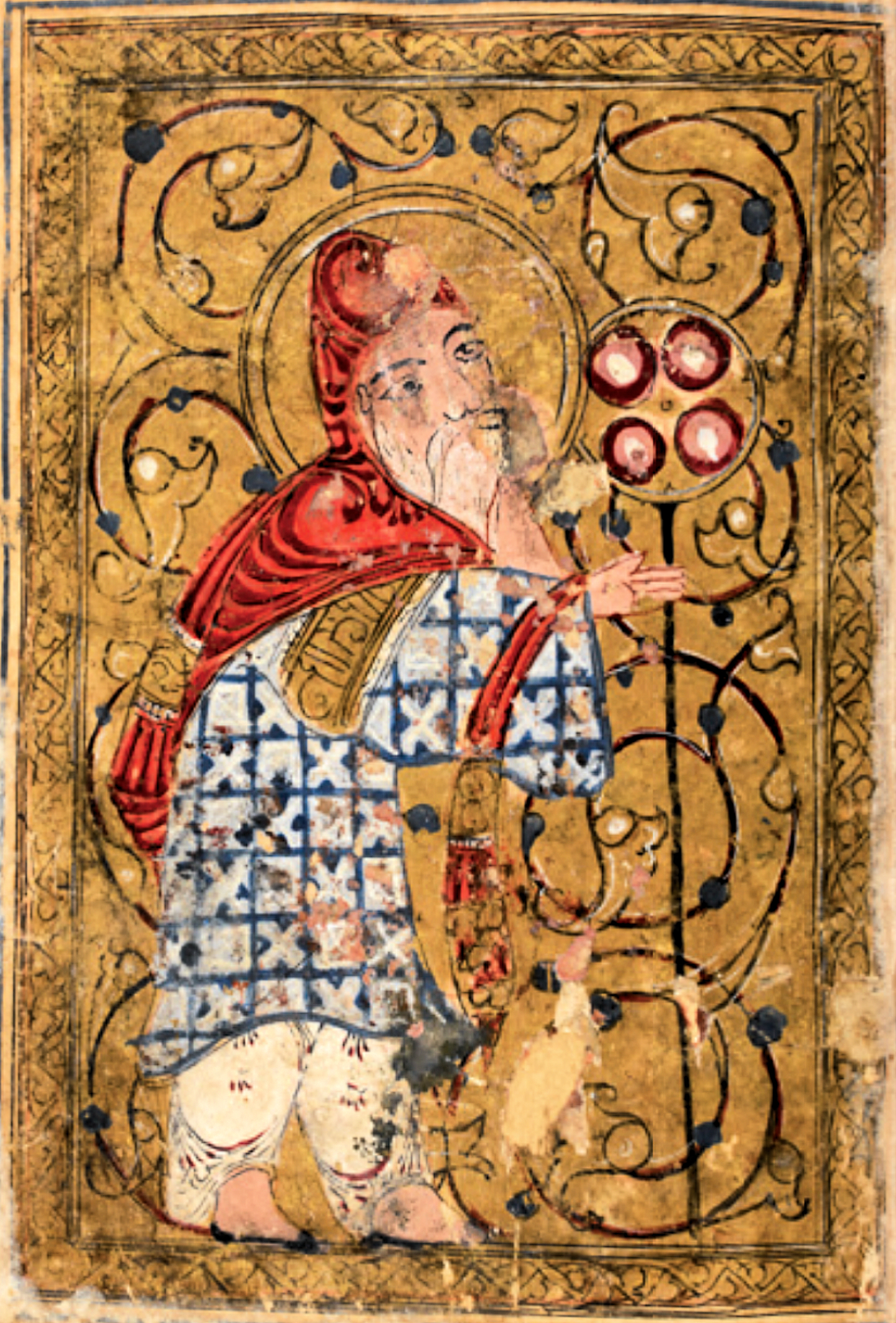
Frontispiece 2. Sage holding a flabellum

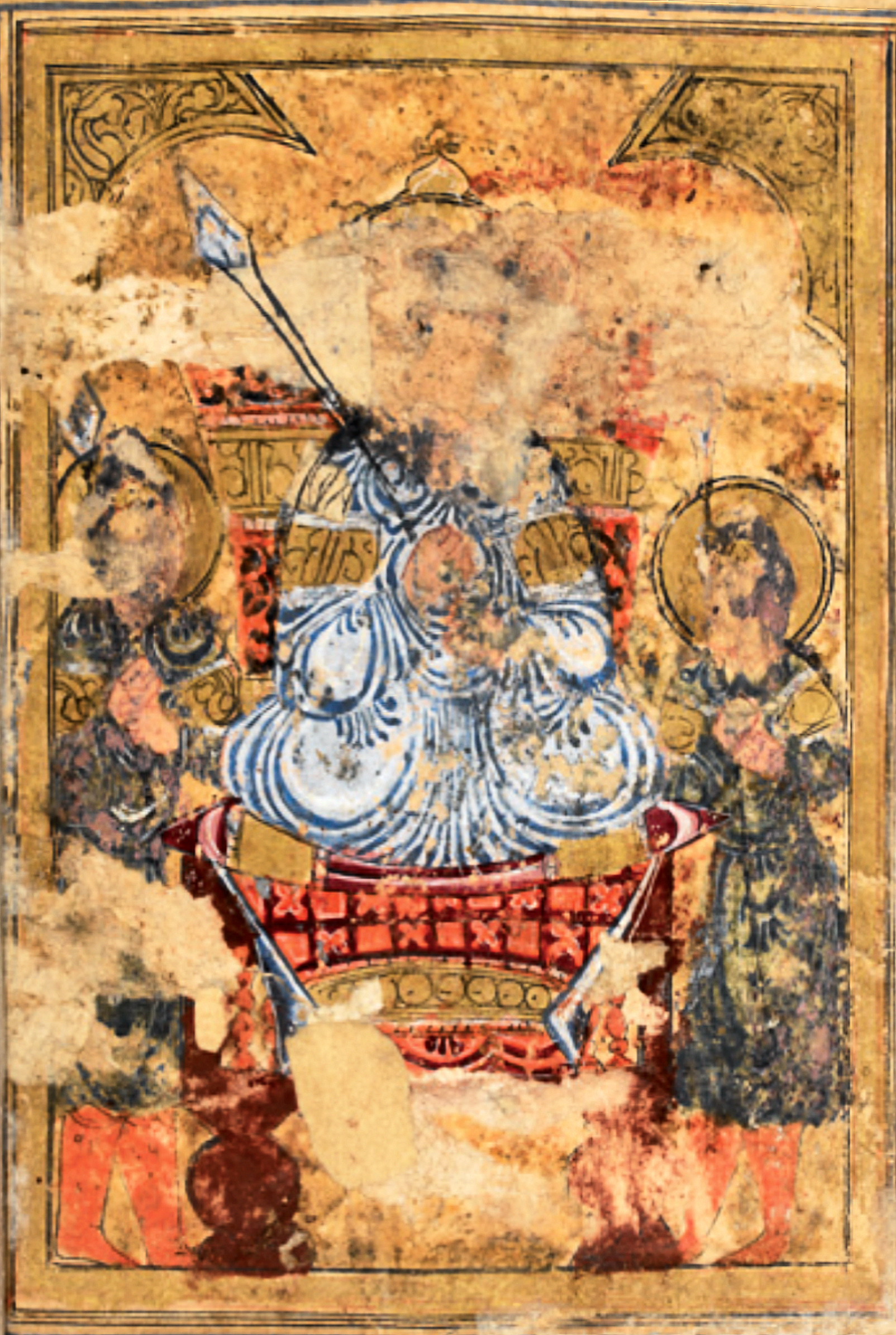
Frontispiece 3. Ruler-Prince with crown, enthroned with two Turkic-style attendants.

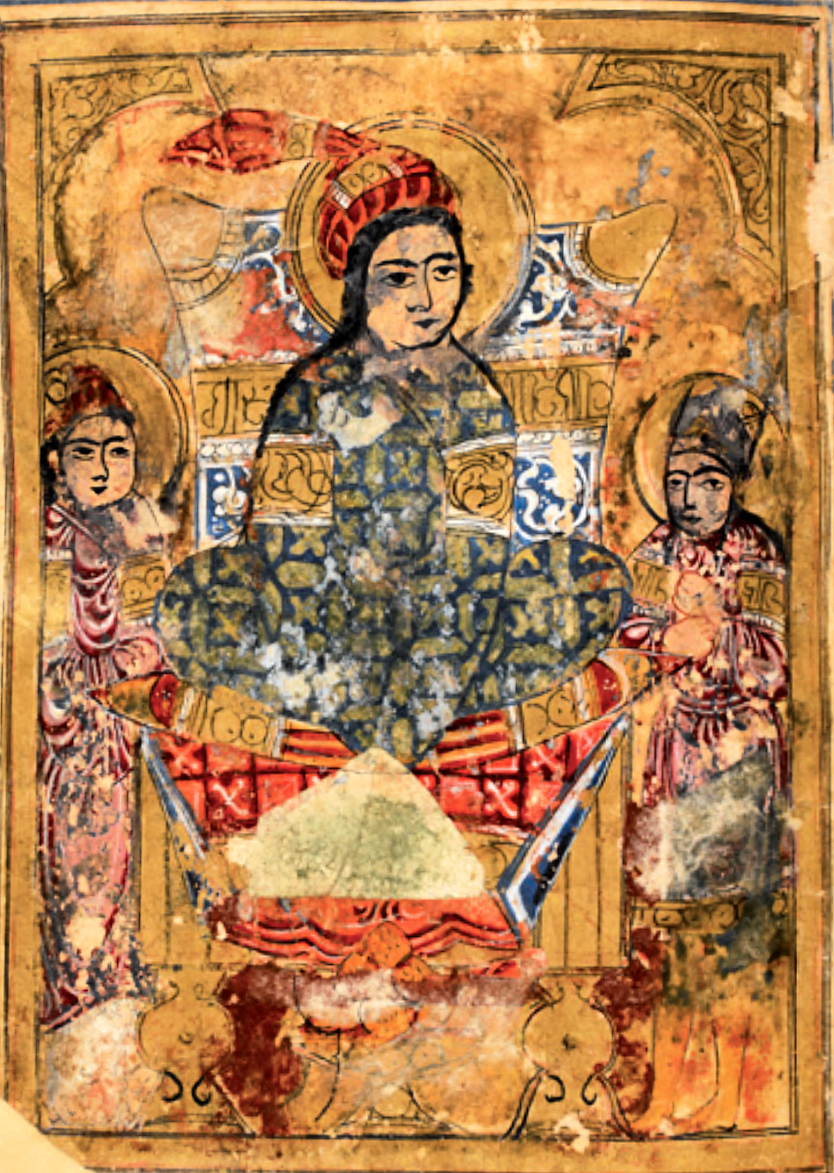
Frontispiece 4. Scholar-Prince with turban, enthroned with two attendants.

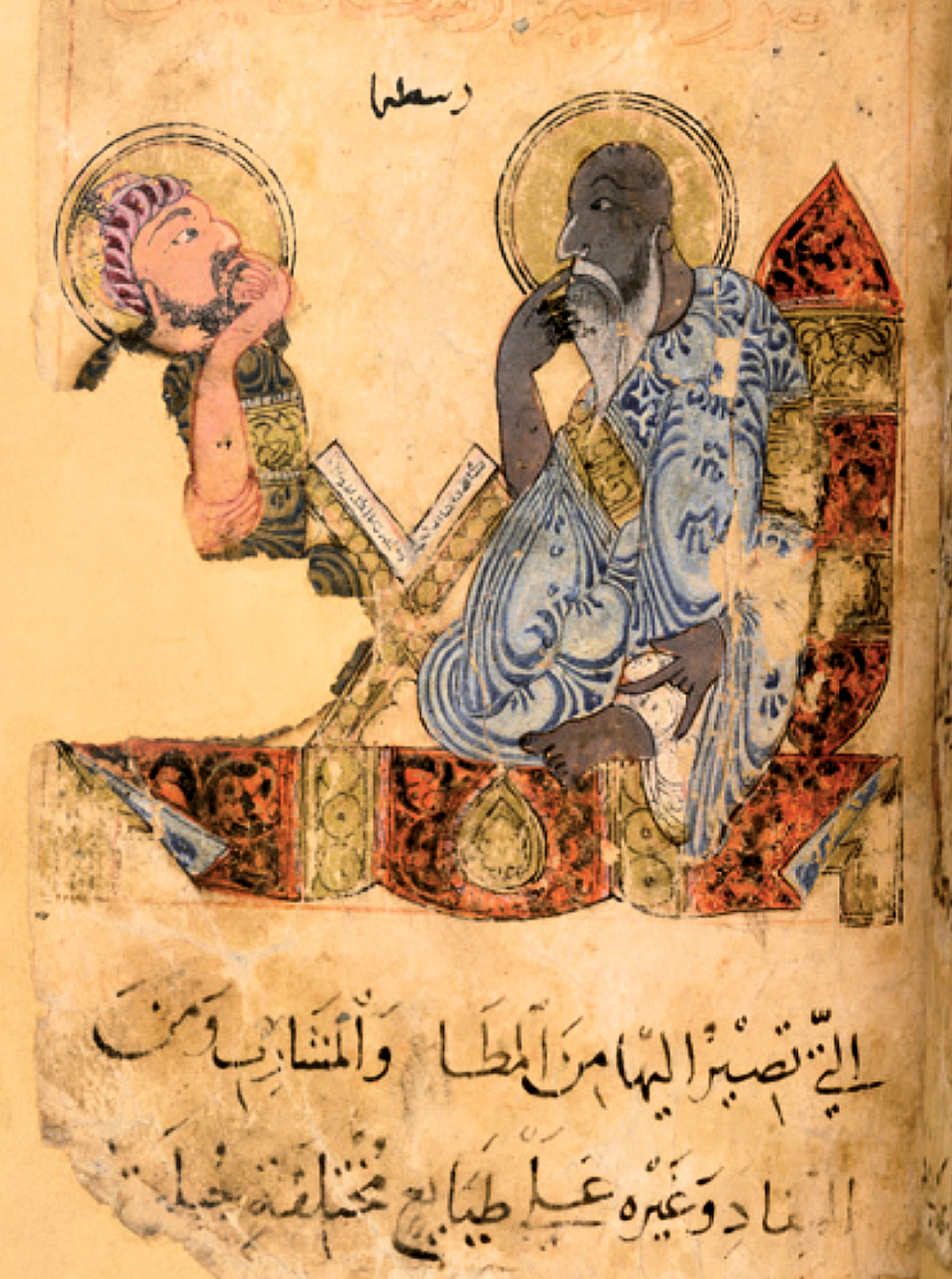
A student sitting with Aristotle (right). Mention sūrat al-ḥakīm Aristūṭālīs ̣(“Representation of the Sage Aristotle”).

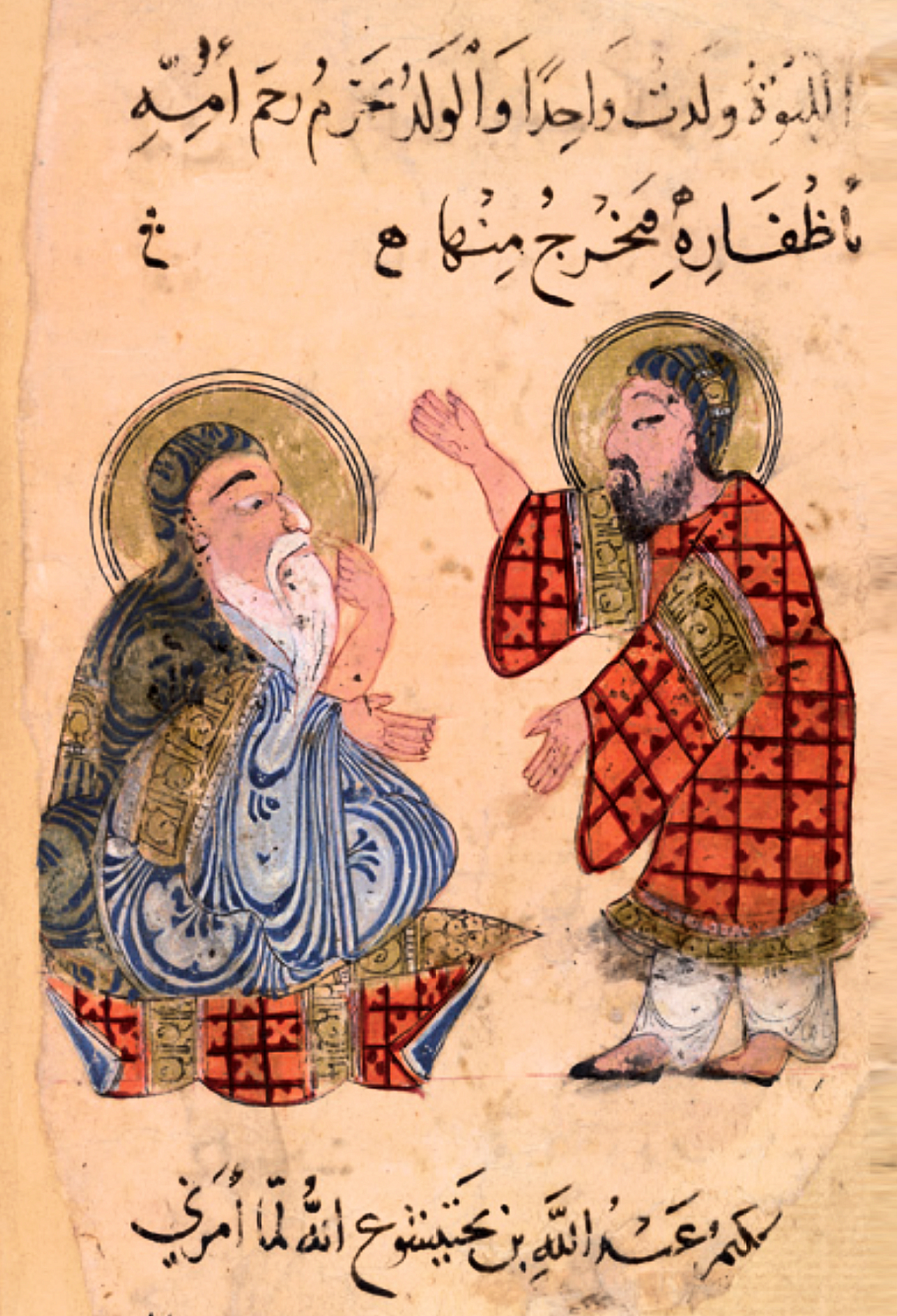
Ibn Bakhtīshūʿ and a pupil.

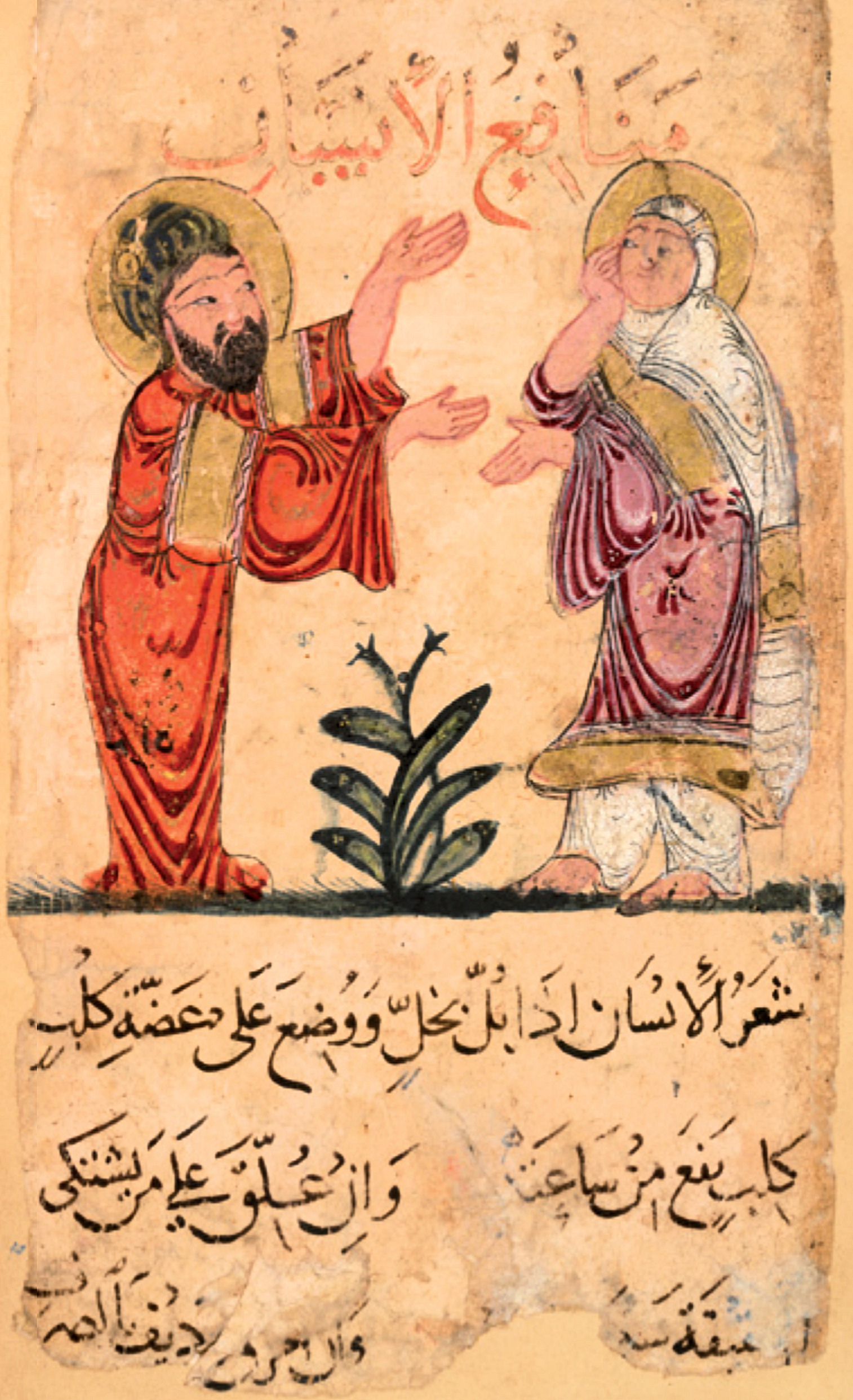
Man and woman

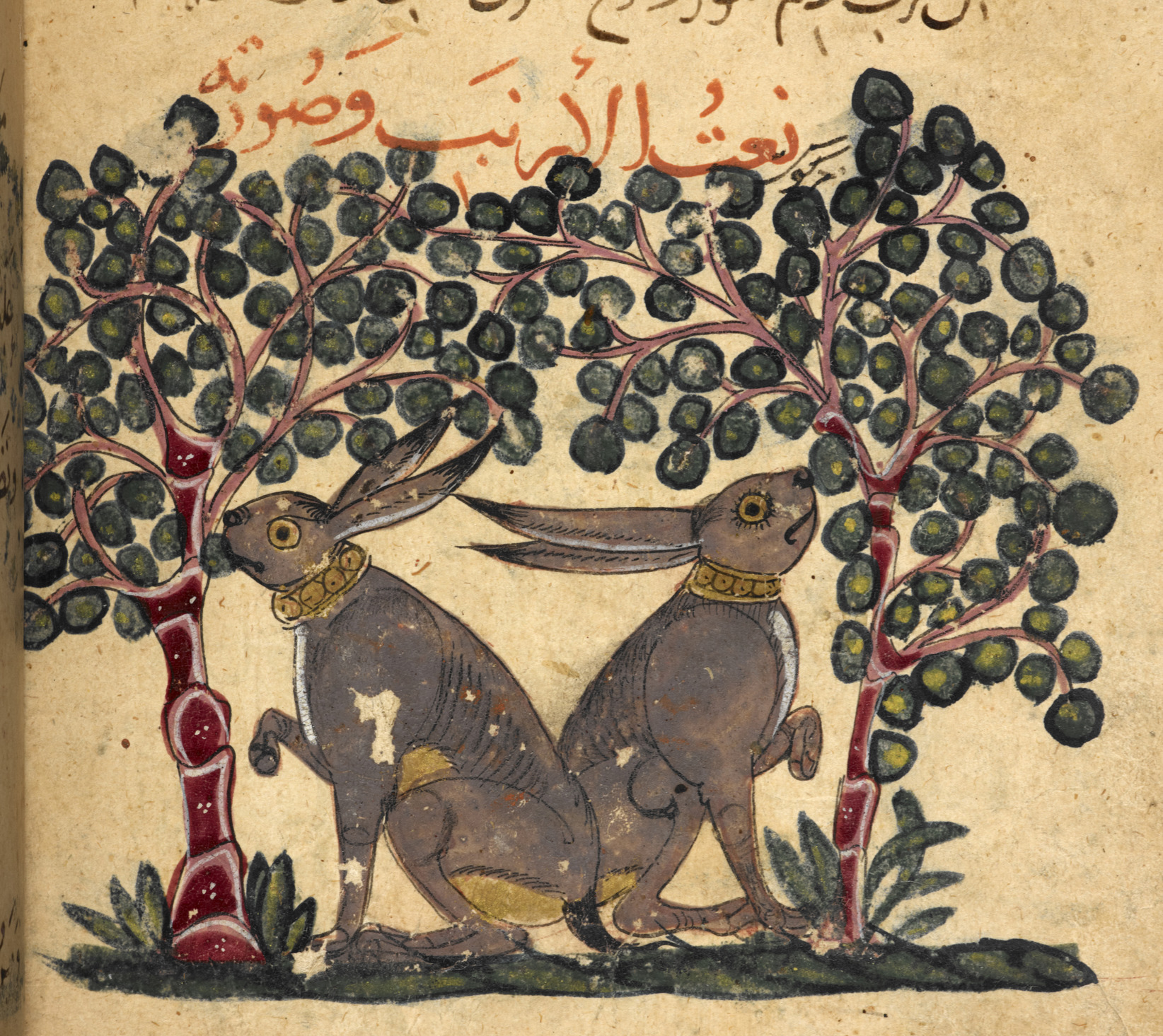
Two hares eating berries

== Sources ==
- Contadini, Anna (1 January 2012). A World of Beasts: A Thirteenth-Century Illustrated Arabic Book on Animals (the Kitāb Na‘t al-Ḥayawān) in the Ibn Bakhtīshū‘ Tradition. Brill. doi:10.1163/9789004222656_005.
