= Morgan Library, MS M.500 =

Medieval Persian manuscript by Ibn Bukhtishu

Manafi'-i hayavan
- Pierpont Morgan Library, New York, M.500
- Type: Bestiary
- Date: 1297–1298 or 1299–1300
- Place of origin: Maragheh, Iran
- Language: Persian
- Scribe: Ibn Bukhtishu
- Patron: Shams al-Din ibn Żiyāʼ al-Dīn al-Zūshkī
- Material: Wove paper
- Size: 355 mm × 280 mm (14.0 in × 11.0 in); 86 leaves
- Condition: Original size approximately 375 mm × 310 mm (14.8 in × 12.2 in), most miniatures are heavily in- and overpainted with later restorers adding new miniatures, sometimes over existing text
- Script: Naskh; Kufic

The Morgan Library, MS M.500 is a 13th-century illuminated manuscript of the Manafi'-i hayavan ("The Benefits of Animals") by Ibn Bukhtishu (980–1058). It was bought by the Pierpont Morgan Library in 1912 and has been in its collection since.

This copy was commissioned either 697 or 699 AH (corresponding to 1297–1298 or 1299–1300) by Shams al-Din ibn Żiyāʼ al-Dīn al-Zūshkī, whose name is written in the medallion on folio 2. Together with a copy of the Tarikh-i Jahangushay, dated to 1290, is among the oldest extant examples of the "metropolitan style" of the Mongol Ilkhanid court.

== Background Information ==
The M.500 Manafi'-i hayavan is one of the oldest surviving illustrated manuscripts from the reign of the Mongol ruler Ghazan (r. 1295–1304). The colophon states that it was written in Maragheh, Iran, in 699 or 697 AH. The original text was composed in Baghdad and written in Arabic. It was then translated into Persian by ʻAbd al-Hādī ibn Muḥammad ibn Maḥmūd ibn Ibrahīm al-Marāghī at the command of Ghazan. As Shams al-Din is named as the patron, it is unlikely that this copy is the original first translation. It is possible, however, that the M.500 Manafi'-i hayavan animal depictions were traced from larger miniatures belonging to the royal copy, which had bigger folios.

The manuscript includes 103 miniatures across 86 folios. Barbara Schmitz identifies five different artists, who worked on the paintings: Three painters from the 13th century and two restorers, likely from the 19th century. Most of the miniatures have been overpainted or altered through heavily speculative inpainting. 13 of them are modern additions altogether, painted over the original text by the restorers.

== Structure ==
The Manafi'-i hayavan of Ibn Buktishu is divided into four sections: The characteristics and benefits of humans; of quadrupeds and beasts; of birds; and of insects and reptiles. Each entry begins with a general description of the animal as well as its behaviour and habits. The content of these descriptions is loosely derived from Aristotle's work, in particular his Historia Animalium, of which the earliest translations into Arabic can be dated into the 9th century. The next segment, however, seems to have been compiled by Ibn Buktishu himself, listing potential medicinal benefits that can be derived from the animal and suggesting different medical prescriptions based on them. These entries are accompanied by miniatures depicting the animals, most often in a – at least rudimentary – landscape setting.

== Miniatures ==
The paintings of this manuscript ‘Manafi'-i hayavan’ have a distinctive style. They consist of animals set among stylized landscape features. The trees and water are not directly drawn from nature, instead, they are composed of stylized vegetation that is placed in a decorative pattern on the stems. Additionally, the majority of the miniatures in the Morgan Library are framed, and the background vegetation is depicted with scant naturalism. Most paintings reflect earlier Mesopotamian and Arab styles but several also display a new feature, Chinese influence.

=== Painter I in the Traditional 'Arab' Style ===
The horizon in Figures 1-2 consists only of a grassy ground, and the background shows stylized trees as well as birds, which are common in earlier Arab paintings. However, the animal bodies in both paintings are drawn in a more calligraphical, naturalistic Chinese style painting.

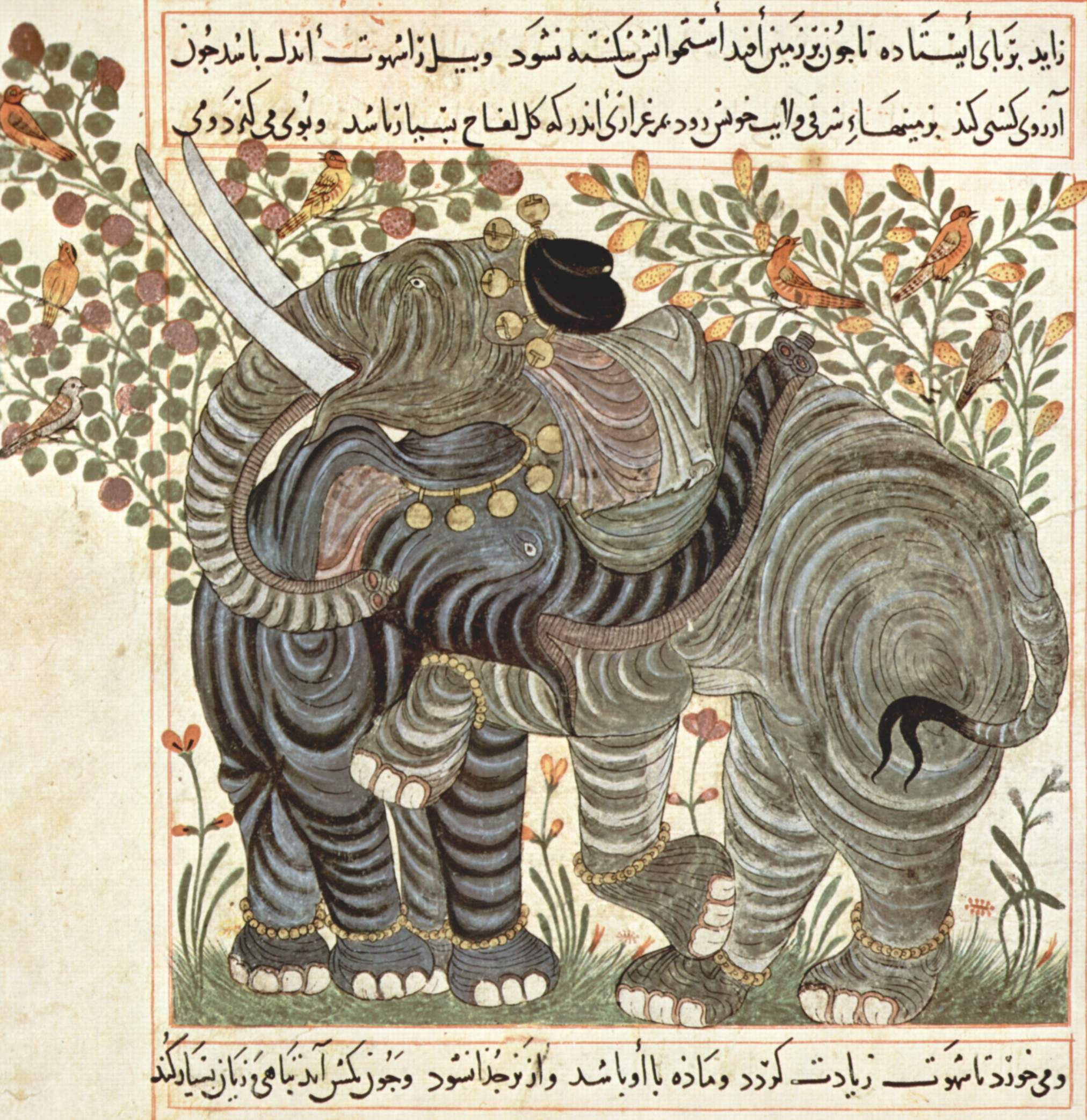
Figure 1. Two elephants, Manafi'-i hayavan in the background, birds in flowering plants, by Ibn Bakhtishu, 1295. The Morgan Library and Museum, NY

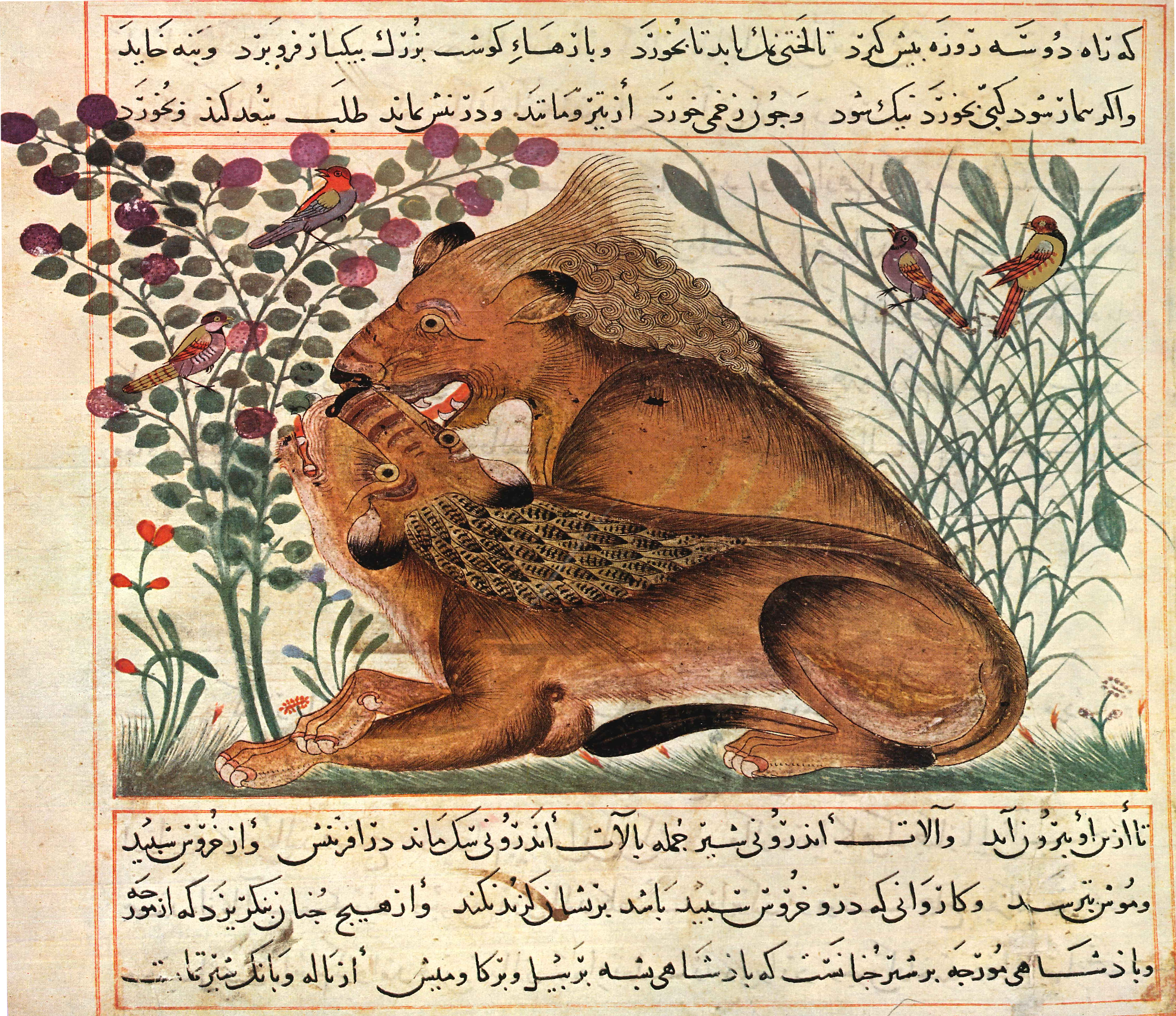
Figure 2. Seated lion behind reclining lioness, Manafi'-i hayavan, from the Bestiary of Ibn Bakhtishu, Maragha, 1298

=== Mongol Influences in Painter II and III's Work ===
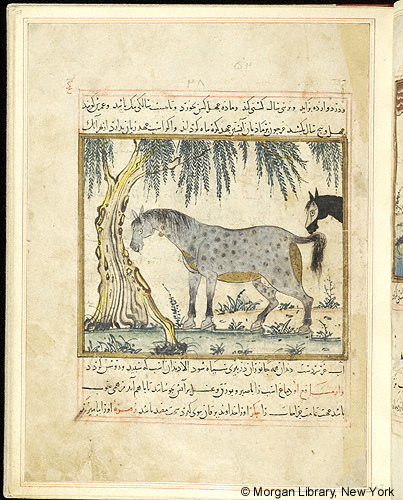
Figure 3. A mare followed by a stallion, standing beneath willow tree, from Manafay al Hayawan, Maragha, 1297-1299

Persian painting now started to use a technique that was previously common in China in which the frame cut off elements within it, as if looking through a window. An example of this can be found in "A mare followed by a stallion," from 'Manafi'-i hayavan’, 1297–1299, Maragha. (Figure 3). Unlike earlier Arab paintings, the frame now cuts off the scene from the viewer. Other Chinese influences include the use of multiple horizons and the detailed depiction of the knotted trunk of the tree.
