= 'Ubayd Allah ibn Bakhtishu =

Medieval Persian physician (980–1058)

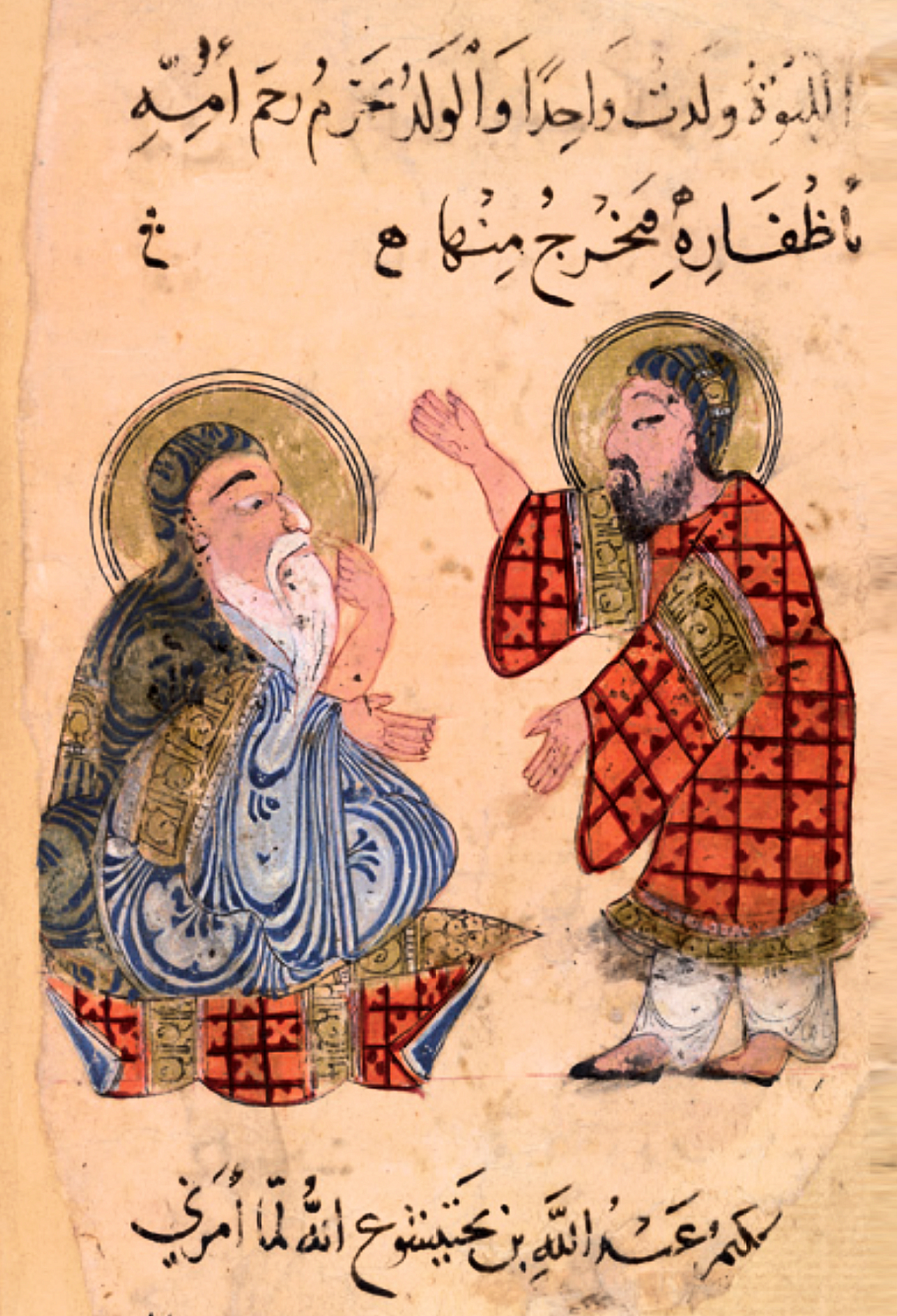
Abdullah Ibn Bakhtishu with a student.

Abu Sa'id 'Ubayd Allah ibn Bakhtishu (980–1058), also spelled Bukhtishu, Bukhtyashu, and Bakhtshooa in many texts, was an 11th-century Syriac physician, descendant of Bakhtshooa Gondishapoori. He spoke the Syriac language. He lived in Mayyāfāriqīn.

He was the last representative of the Bukhtyashu family of Church of the East physicians, who emigrated from Jundishapur to Baghdad in 765. He authored Reminder of the Homestayer, which deals with the philosophical terms used in medicine, and a treatise on lovesickness. He also authored the Book on the Characteristics of Animals and Their Properties and the Usefulness of Their Organs, which covers works by Aristotle, Hippocrates, Galen, Dioscorides, and ʿĪsā ibn ʿAlī, as well as Manafi' al-Hayawan (Ms M. 500).

== See also ==
- List of Iranian scientists
- The Bukhtishu family.
- Bukhtishu, Gabriel ibn.
- Yuhanna ibn Bukhtishu
