= Jabril ibn Bukhtishu =

9th century Christian physician in the Abbasid Caliphate

Jabril ibn Bukhtishu ܓܒܪܐܝܠ ܒܪ ܒܟܬܐܝܫܘܥ
- Born: 8th century
- Died: 828 AD; Ctesiphon (modern-day Baghdad)
- Resting place: Monastery of St. Sergios in Ctesiphon
- Occupation: Physician
- Notable work: Treatise on Medicine and Psychological Phenomena

Jabril ibn Bukhtishu (also spelled Jibril ibn Bakhtisha, Gabriel bar Bokhtisho', or Bakhtyshu) was an influential 8th–9th century physician from the prominent Bukhtishu (Bokhtisho') family, a dynasty of Church of the East Christian doctors associated with the Academy of Gondishapur. He spoke Syriac, though much of his medical work was composed in Arabic.

== Life and career ==
Jabril was the grandson of Jirjis ibn Jibril and lived during the second half of the 8th century. He first served as physician to Ja'far al-Barmaki and later to the Abbasid caliphs Harun al-Rashid (r. 786–809), Al-Amin (r. 809–813), and Al-Ma'mun (r. 813–833). He died in 828/829 and was buried in the Monastery of St. Sergios in Ctesiphon.

He proved his worth to Harun al-Rashid in 805 AD by successfully treating one of the caliph's slaves, a feat that earned him the position of director of Baghdad's major hospital that bore al-Rashid's name. His reputation extended beyond medicine; the caliph frequently sought his counsel on various administrative matters, even requesting his intervention when the vizier, Yahya al-Barmaki, made errors.

Jabril is mentioned several times in the letters of Catholicos Timothy I (d. 823). In Letter 47 he assisted Timothy in obtaining copies of the Syro-Hexapla, while in Letter 21 he interceded with the caliph on Timothy's behalf. Despite their cooperation, Timothy is said to have rebuked Jabril for his philandering; later traditions report that Jabril repented of this behavior.

=== Medical Contributions ===
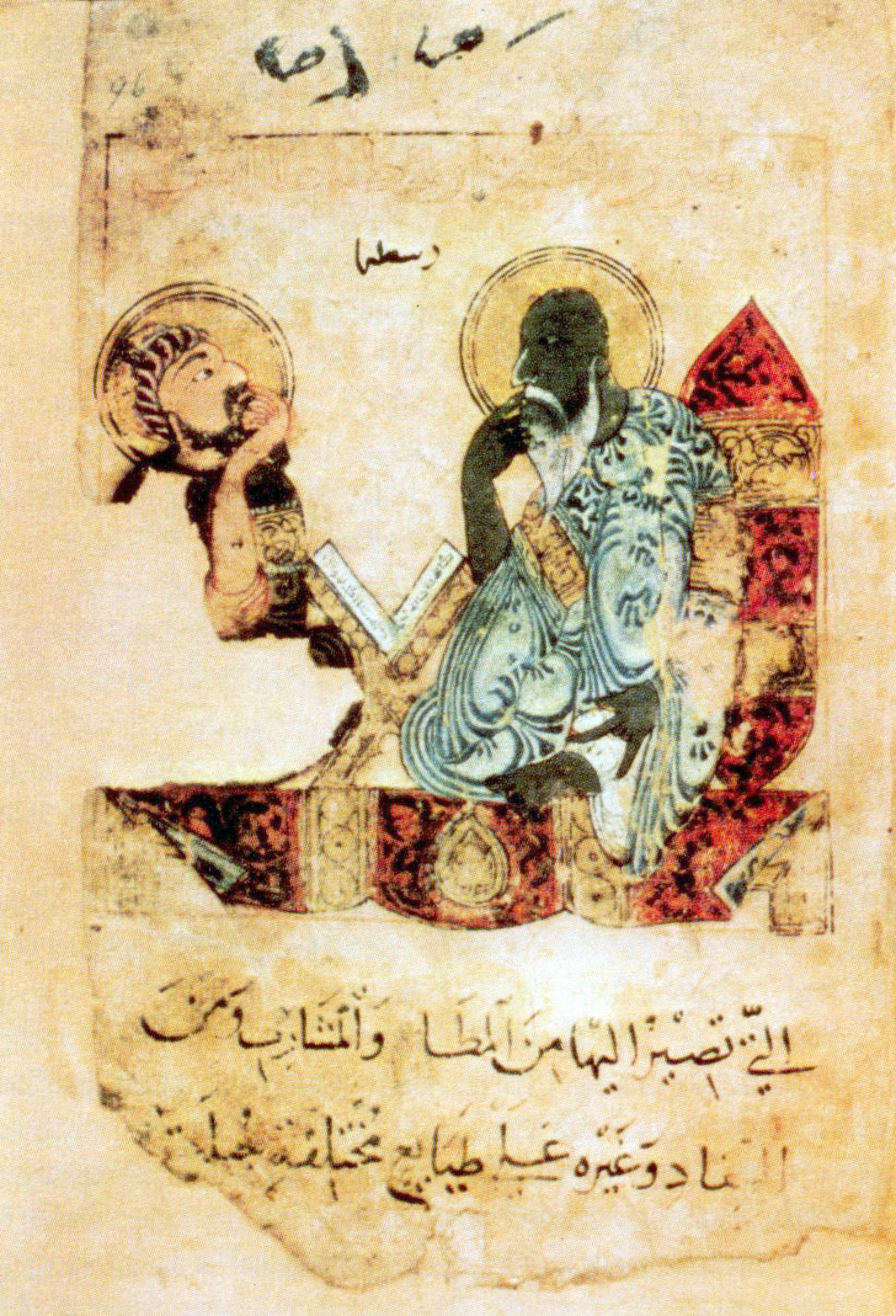
A folio of the earliest manuscript of the Kitāb naʿt al-hayawān, attributed to ibn Bukhtishu, depicting Aristotle

Jabril was a leading figure in the transmission of Greek science into the Islamic world. He is credited with commissioning translations of Galen and other Greek authors through figures such as Iyob of Edessa and Hunayn ibn Ishaq. Besides his role as a patron of translation, he also authored a number of medical works, including:

- Kitāb ṭabā'iʿ al-ḥayawān wa-khawāṣṣihā wa-manāfi' a'ḍā'ihā ("Book of the Characteristics of Animals, Their Properties, and the Usefulness of Their Organs"), written for Nasir al-Dawla
- Risāla fī al-ṭibb wa-al-aḥdāth al-nafsāniyya ("Treatise on Medicine and Psychological Phenomena")
- Kitāb naʿt al-ḥayawān ("Book on the Description of Animals")

Although little of his corpus survives intact, these works show his interest in physiology, psychology, and zoology and puts him as one of the foremost scientific authorities in Abbasid Baghdad.

== Legacy and influence ==
Jabril was widely cited by later Syriac and Arabic writers. He appears in the Lexicon of Hasan bar Bahlul, and is mentioned in the Catalogue of ʿAbdishoʿ of Nisibis, where his role is somewhat ambiguous — either as an author of a lexicon himself or as one of the principal sources for Bar Bahlul.

Jabril ibn Bukhtishu was one of the leading physicians of his time. The work and support he provided helped to establish a foundation for the flourishing of medical science in the Abbasid era, and his personal associations linked the Nestorian intellectual community with the Abbasid court at Baghdad.

== See also ==
- List of Persian scientists
- The Bukhtishu family
- Abdollah ibn Bukhtishu
- Yuhanna ibn Bukhtishu

== Sources ==
- Brock, Sebastian P.; Butts, Aaron M.; Kiraz, George A.; Van Rompay, Lucas (2011). "Gorgias Encyclopedic Dictionary of the Syriac Heritage". Beth Mardutho. ISBN 978-1-59333-714-8.
- Weststeijn, Johan (2008). "Van het Reve on 'Literaturwissenschaft'". In Haard, Eric Alexander; Stelleman, Jenny (eds.). Literature and Beyond: Festschrift for Willem G. Weststeijn on the Occasion of His 65th Birthday. Pegasus. pp. 867–884. hdl:11245/1.295297. ISBN 978-90-6143-326-2.
