= Bukhtishu =

7–9th-century family of physicians

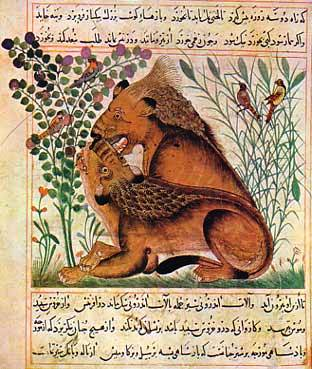
Ibn Bakhtishu's Manafi' al-Hayawan (منافع الحيوان ), dated 12th century. Captions appear in Persian language.

The Bukhtīshūʿ (or Boḵtīšūʿ) were a family of either Persian or Syrian Eastern Christian physicians from the seventh, eighth, and ninth centuries, spanning six generations and 250 years. The Middle Persian-Syriac name which can be found as early as at the beginning of the 5th century refers to the eponymous ancestor of this "Syro-Persian Nestorian family". Some members of the family served as the personal physicians of Caliphs. Jurjis son of Bukht-Yishu was awarded 10,000 dinars by al-Mansur after attending to his malady in 765AD. It is even said that one of the members of this family was received as physician to Ali ibn Husayn Zayn al-Abidin, the Shia Imam, during his illness in the events of Karbala.

Like most physicians in the early Abbasid courts, they came from the Academy of Gondishapur in what is now southwest Iran. They were well versed in the Greek and Indian sciences, including those of Plato, Aristotle, Pythagoras, and Galen, which they aided in translating while working in Gondishapur.

In the course of their integration into the changing society after the Muslim conquest of Persia, the family acquired Arabic while preserving Persian as oral language for about 200 years.

The family was originally from Ahvaz, near Gondeshapur, however they eventually moved to the city of Baghdad and later on to Nsibin in Syria. Yahya ibn Khalid, the vizier and mentor to Harun al-Rashid, provided patronage to the Hospital and Academy of Gondeshapur and helped assure the promotion and growth of astronomy, medicine and philosophy, not only in Persia but also in the Abbasid Empire in general.

== Etymology ==
Consisting of a first, Middle Persian term meaning "redeemed" and a Syriac component for Yeshua/Jesus, the name can be translated as "Redeemed by Jesus" or "Jesus has redeemed". However, in his book Kitāb ʿUyūn al-anbāʿ fī ṭabaqāt al-aṭibbāʿ (كتاب عيون الأنباء في طبقات الأطباء), the Arab, 12th-century historian Ibn Abi Usaibia renders the meaning as "Servant of Jesus" (في اللغة السريانية البخت العبد ويشوع عيسى عليه السلام) in Syriac language.

== Members ==
There are no known remaining records of the first two members of the family. And the remaining records of the chain start from Jurjis. But the genealogical sequence follows as:

=== Jurjis ===
Jurjis, the father of Bukhtishu II and grandfather of Jibril ibn Bukhtishu, was a scientific writer and was the director of the hospital in Gondeshapur, which supplied physicians to courts in Iraq, Syria, and Persia. He was called to Baghdad in 765 AD to treat the stomach complaint of the Caliph al-Mansur. After successfully curing the caliph, he was asked to remain in attendance in Baghdad, which he did until he fell ill in 769 CE. Before allowing him to return to Gondeshapur, the caliph invited him to convert to Islam but he declined, saying that he wanted to be with his fathers when he died. Amused by his obstinacy, the caliph sent an attendant with Jurjis to ensure he reached his destination. In exchange for the attendant and a 10,000 dinar wage, Jurjis promised to send his pupil Isa ibn Shahla to the caliph, since his son, Bukhtishu II, could not be spared from the hospital at Gondeshapur.

=== Bukhtishu II ===
Bukhtishu II was the son of Jurjis ibn Bukhtishu and the father of Jibril ibn Bukhtishu. He was left in charge of the hospital at Gondeshapur when his father was summoned to treat the stomach complaints of Caliph al-Mansur. Jurjis never intended for Bukhtishu II to go to Baghdad and tend to the caliphs and had offered to send one of his pupils in his stead. Nevertheless, Bukhtishu II was in turn called to the city to treat the Caliph al-Hadi, who was gravely ill. He was unable to establish himself in Baghdad until 787 AD, when Caliph Harun al-Rashid was suffering violently painful headaches. He successfully treated Harun al-Rashid and in gratitude the caliph made him physician-in-chief, a post he held onto until his death in 801 C.E.

=== Jabril ibn Bukhtishu ===
Alternate Spellings: Djibril b. Bukhtishu’, Jibril ibn Bakhtishu', Jibra’il ibn Bukhtyishu, Djabra’il b. Bakhtishu

Jibril ibn Bukhtishu was the son of Bukhtishu II, who served the caliphs in Baghdad from 787 AD until his death in 801 AD. In 791 AD, Bukhtishu II recommended Jibril as a physician to Jafar the Barmakid, the vizier of the Caliph Harun al-Rashid. Despite the recommendation, Jibril did not succeed his father until 805 AD, after he successfully treated one of Harun al-Rashid's slaves, thereby winning the confidence of the caliph.

During Jibril's time in Baghdad, he advised Harun al-Rashid in the building of its first hospital. The hospital and connected observatory was modeled after the one in Gondeshapur where Jibril had studied medicine and served as the director. Jibril also served as the director of this new hospital, which Harun al-Rashid named after himself.

The Abbasid court physicians gained high standing and trust once accepted and employed by the caliph, as illustrated by the anecdote in which Harun al-Rashid used Jibril to try to humble his vizier Yahya al-Barmaki on an occasion when Yahya entered the caliph's presence without first gaining permission. In his collection of prose, Tha'alibi cites a story he heard from al-Babbagha:

"Bakhtishu’ ibn Jibril relates from his father…Then al-Rashid turned to me and said, ‘Jibril, is there anyone who would come before you without your permission in your own house?’ I said: ‘No, nor would anyone hope to do that.’ He said: ‘So what is the matter with us that people come in here without permission?’"

After this exchange, Yahya skillfully reminds Harun al-Rashid that he had been granted the privilege of entering his presence without permission by asking the caliph if a change had been made in court etiquette.

Being a part of such court interactions, Jibril would occasionally approach the caliph with a level of frankness not allowed most attendants. During Harun al-Rashid's final illness, Jibril's matter-of-fact responses to the caliph won him disgrace and soon after he was condemned to death. He was saved from execution by Fadl ibn al-Rabi and subsequently became the physician of al-Amin. After al-Ma'mun gained power, Jibril again faced imprisonment, but was needed to treat Hasan ibn Sahl and thus was released in 817 AD. Three years later he was replaced by his son-in-law, Mikha’il, but was again called to Baghdad in 827 AD when Mikha’il was unable to treat the caliph. He died in the favor of the caliph sometime between 827 and 829 AD and, being Christian, was buried in the Monastery of St. Sergius in Ctesiphon which is in modern-day Iraq, on the east bank of the Tigris.

During the ninth and tenth century, the Bukhtishus had a virtual monopoly on the practice of medicine in Baghdad. Jibril is estimated to have a career income of 88,800,000 dirhams for serving Harun al-Rashid for 23 years and the Barmakids for 13, which does not include his fees from lesser patients.

Hunayn ibn Ishaq gained Jibril's his recommendation after studying Greek for several years, which allowed him to become known in later centuries in both the Near East and in Europe for his translations.

=== Jibrail III ===
Jibrail III was the son of Ubayd Allah ibn Bukhtishu, a finance official for the Caliph al-Muktadir. After his father's death, his mother married another physician. Jibrail III began studying medicine exclusively in Baghdad, where he went penniless after the death of his mother. After treating an envoy from Kirman, he was called to Shiraz by the Buyid ruler 'Adud al-Dawla but soon after he returned to Baghdad. He only left Baghdad for short consultations, even declining an offer from the Fatimid al-Aziz who wished to establish him in Cairo. Jibrail III died on June 8, 1006.

== See also ==
- List of Iranian scientists
