= Hidayat =

Hidayat, Hidayet, Hedayet, or Hedayat is a masculine given name and surname of Arabic origin. Notable people with the name include:

== Given name ==
=== Hedayat ===
- Hedayat Amin Arsala (1942–2025), Afghan politician
- Hedayat Lotfian, Iranian military officer

=== Hedayet ===
- Hedayet Ahmed (1933–2001), Bangladeshi civil servant, diplomat, and international official

=== Hidayat ===
- Hidayat (poet), Azerbaijani poet and Aq Qoyunlu statesman
- Hidayat Arsani (born 1963), Indonesian businessman and politician
- Hidayat ur Rehman Baloch, Pakistani politician and social activist
- Hidayat Heydarov (born 1997), Azerbaijani judoka
- Hidayat Jafarov (born 1946), Azerbaijani archaeologist, doctor of historical sciences, and professor
- Hidayat Inayat Khan (1917–2016), English-French classical composer and conductor
- Hidayat Manaö (born 1961), Indonesian military officer
- Hidayat Orujov (1944–2026), Azerbaijani politician and writer
- Hidayat ur Rehman (born 1976), Pakistani politician
- Hidayat Rustamov (1970–1991), Azerbaijani war hero
- Hidayat Nur Wahid (born 1960), Indonesian politician

=== Hidayet ===
==== People ====
- Hidayet Bayraktar (born 1962), Turkish ambassador
- Hidayet İpek (1919–2014), Turkish military officer and politician
- Hidayet Karaca (born 1963), Turkish journalist
- Hidayet Şefkatli Tuksal (born 1963), Turkish human rights activist, Islamic feminist, and columnist
- Hidayet Türkoğlu (born 1979), Turkish basketball executive and former professional basketball player

==== Places ====
- Hidayet Mosque, 1813-built mosque in Istanbul, Turkey

== Surname ==
- Arief Hidayat (born 1956), Indonesian judge
- Cucu Hidayat (born 1983), Indonesian footballer
- Djarot Saiful Hidayat (born 1962), Indonesian politician
- Komaruddin Hidayat (born 1953), Indonesian Muslim academic and intellectual
- Mahdi Quli Khan Hidayat (1863–1955), Iranian politician and author
- Mohamad Suleman Hidayat (born 1944), Indonesian businessman and politician
- Muhyi ad-Din Muzaffar Jang Hidayat (died 1751), ruler of Hyderabad
- Rachmad Hidayat (born 1992), Indonesian footballer
- Shahzada Muhammad Hidayat Afshar, Ilahi Bakhsh Bahadur (1809–1878), 23rd head of the Mughal Dynasty
- Shazia Hidayat (born 1976), Pakistani track and field athlete
- Taufik Hidayat (born 1981), Indonesian badminton player

== See also ==
- 12176 Hidayat, minor planet
- Hidayat al-Muta`allemin Fi al-Tibb, Arabic language medical guide written in Dari
- Hidayat TV, Islamic satellite TV Channel based in the United Kingdom
- Hidayatou
