= Sigit Purnomo Said =

Indonesian singer and politician (born 1979)

Member of the House of Representative
- Incumbent
- Assumed office 1 October 2024
- Constituency: Jakarta III

Mayor of Palu Acting
- In office 26 October 2020 – 5 December 2020
- Preceded by: Hidayat
- Succeeded by: Hidayat

3rd Vice Mayor of Palu
- In office 17 February 2016 – 17 February 2021
- Mayor: Hidayat
- Preceded by: Mulhanan Tomobolututu
- Succeeded by: Reny Lamadjido

Personal details
- Born: Sigit Purnomo Syamsudin Said; 27 November 1979 (age 46) Donggala, Central Sulawesi, Indonesia
- Party: National Mandate Party (PAN)
- Spouse(s): Okie Agustina (m. 2003; div. 2009) Adelia Wilhelmina (m. 2011)
- Children: with Okie Agustina: 3, including Kiesha Alvaro Putra Sigit with Adelia Wilhelmina: 4
- Parents: Syamsuddin Said (father); Andi Bumbeng Pasamalangi (mother)
- Occupation: Singer, politician, actor
- Musical career
- Genres: Hard rock; pop melayu; alternative rock; pop rock; post-grunge; soft rock
- Instruments: Vocal; Guitar; Piano
- Label: Trinity Optima Production
- Member of: Ungu

Sigit Purnomo Syamsuddin Said (born 27 November 1979), commonly known as Pasha, is an Indonesian singer and politician who served as Deputy Mayor of Palu, Central Sulawesi from 2016 until 2021, and is currently a member of the Indonesian House of Representatives from the National Mandate Party faction. Before entering politics, Pasha was the vocalist for Indonesian iconic rock band, Ungu and joined Ungu in 1998.

== Career ==
=== Acting career ===
Before joining Ungu, Pasha had previously appeared in the Indonesian entertainment world as a model and had appeared in several television commercials, played in soap operas, and joined several bands. Pasha's vocal abilities were indeed evident since he was a child when he became the second winner of the adhan competition throughout Central Sulawesi. Since he was a child, the fifth of ten siblings, he enjoyed reciting the adzan and the holy verses of the Quran. Pasha had studied at Binus University before finally deciding to drop out and choose a career in Indonesian music industry.

=== Political career ===
Pasha officially registered himself as a candidate for Deputy Mayor of Palu at the Palu Regional Election Commission (KPUD) office on 27 July 2015. He accompanied the candidate for Mayor of Palu Hidayat, who previously served as the former Head of the Central Sulawesi Regional Civil Service Agency and was supported by the National Awakening Party (PKB) and the National Mandate Party (PAN). In an interview, Pasha said that young people are worthy of leading the City of Palu so that the capital of Central Sulawesi can develop further and be known nationally. Pasha also hopes for support, "Let's eliminate personal interests or group interests. Let's oversee the development of the City of Palu together."

== Personal life ==
On 20 November 2008, Okie filed for divorce from Pasha at the Bogor Religious Court, West Java. When she filed for divorce, Okie was pregnant. Then on 20 January 2009, the judge at the Bogor Religious Court, West Java finally officially granted Okie's divorce suit against Pasha, so that the journey of the household that they had built for six years, since 22 August 2003, has now sunk and they have finally officially separated forever.

On 14 February 2009, coincided with Valentine's Day, Pasha's ex-wife, Okie gave birth to their third child at Hermina Mother & Child Hospital, Bogor.

On 27 March 2011, Pasha married Adelia Wilhelmina. On 22 December 2011, Pasha was blessed with his first child from Adelia, Dewa Hikari Zaidan Ibrahim. On 17 August 2013, Pasha was blessed with a second child from Adelia, namely Sakha Dyandra Sultan Yusuf. On 7 December 2015, Pasha was blessed with a third child from Adelia, namely Aliyan Akhtar Raja Sulaiman. On 21 April 2017, Pasha was blessed with a fourth child from Adelia, namely Princess Kayla Mutiara Pasha.

== Electoral history ==
Election	Legislative body	District	Political party	Votes	Remarks
2024	House of Representatives	Jakarta III	PAN	50,222	Won
