= Iranian traditional medicine =

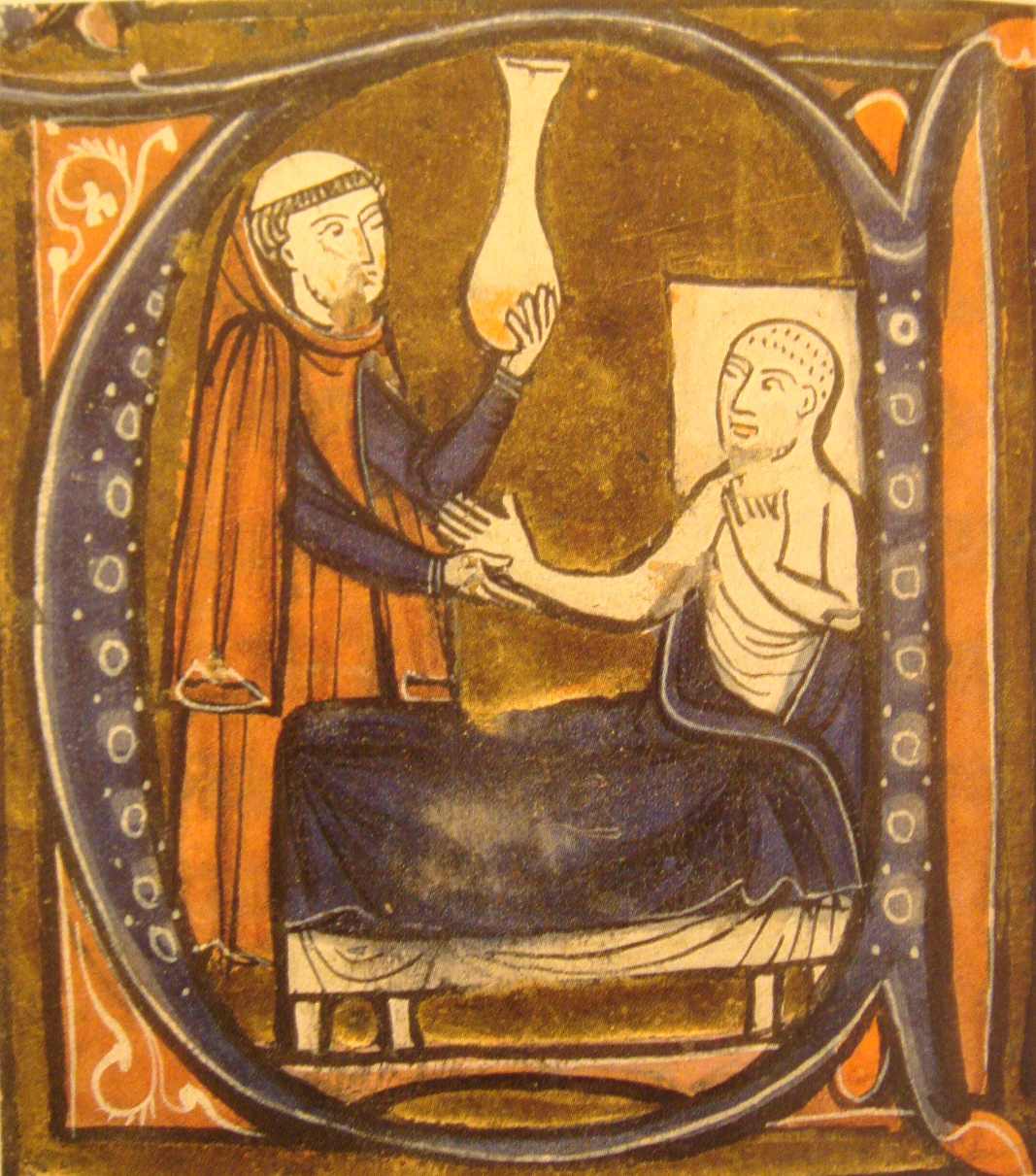
13th century depiction of Rhazes browsing urine samples of patients, in Gerard of Cremona

Iranian traditional medicine (ITM) (Persian: طب سنتی‌ ایرانی, romanized: tebbe sonnati-e irāni), also known as Persian traditional medicine, is one of the most ancient forms of traditional medicine.

ITM is grounded in the concept of four humors: phlegm (Balgham), blood (Dam), yellow bile (Ṣafrā') and black bile (Saudā'). The four humors concept is based on the teachings of Rhazes and Avicenna into an elaborate medical system.

Some scholars believe that efforts for revitalizing ITM in recent years have shaped two main attitudes: evidence-based medicine, and quackery but there is also a pseudoscientific stream in the field.

== Iranian Traditional Medicine Faculty ==
A traditional medicine school inTehran

The prerequisites for launching and approving the field of traditional medicine were provided in 2006 by the Ministry of Health. Four Tehran Medical Sciences Universities, Shahid Beheshti Medical Sciences, Iran Medical Sciences and Shahed, have announced their readiness to recruit students. The first Faculty of Traditional Iranian Medicine in Tehran was opened at Tehran University of Medical Sciences in 2007. 8 Iranian traditional medicine schools have been activated in the country.

== Traditional medicine specialized clinic ==
A traditional medicine health center in Isfahan, Iran

A traditional medicine health center (polyclinic) is a central traditional medicine clinic that offers traditional medicine services including wellness measures, manual methods (such as cupping and steam inhalation), and pharmaceutical treatments.Currently, 56 traditional Iranian medicine health centers are active in Iran, hosting 92 traditional pharmacies in traditional medicine pharmacies, and 56 traditional herbal medicines are also covered by insurance.

== History ==
Globally, this medicine reached its peak in Iran, concurrent with polymaths such as Muhammad ibn Zachariah al-Razi, Ibn Sina and Esmaeil Jorjani. Ancient Iranian Medicine, the basic knowledge of four humors as a healing system, was developed by Hakim Ibn Sina in his medical encyclopedia The Canon of Medicine.

=== Health maintenance ===
According to a definition given in one of the first Iranian medical textbooks called Hidayat al-Muta'allemin Fi al-Tibb (translated as 'A Guide to Medical Learners'), written by Al-Akhawyni Bokhari in the 10th century, medicine is a technique of scientifically maintaining the health of human beings, and restoring it when it deteriorates.

ITM strongly focuses on prioritizing health maintenance and disease prevention over treatment.

=== Attari ===
Herbs, spices and plant extracts for traditional Persian medicine are often sold in a kind of specialized shop called an attari. Operation of such a drug store is regulated by the government.

== Principles ==
The lifestyle rules in ITM are focused on six core principles, known as Setah Zaroriah in Persian. Nutrition, environment, physical activity, sleeping patterns, emotions, and ridding the body from waste materials, are the six fundamental and guiding principles behind the ITM lifestyle. It is believed that health is found in recognizing one's temperament, or physical and mental characteristics, and using this information to guide your lifestyle.

== Temperament ==
=== Mizaj (temperament) ===
ITM is a holistic medicine based on individual differences, a concept known as "Mizaj", or temperament. It is a set of physical and mental characteristics, defined by certain symptoms in the body and mind. According to ITM, everybody has a definite Mizaj which determines all physical or mental characteristics. Generally, Mizaj represents the excess or lack of warmness and humidity in one's body, and is classified into four qualities: warmness (Persian: گرمی, transliteration: garmī), coldness (Persian: سردی, transliteration: sardī), dryness, and wetness. Mizaj is a spectrum, and some have warmer Mizaj than others. No two individuals have exactly the same Mizaj, but they can resemble one another to some extent. It is believed that Mizaj is determined in the embryo. Consistently, the parents' Mizaj can also be a determining factor in the child's Mizaj.

While the Mizaj is forming, one or two of the four qualities can become dominant and determine the main Mizaj. Therefore, the tempers are classified into nine categories: warm, cold, wet, dry, warm and dry, warm and wet, cold and dry, cold and wet, and moderate—where none of the qualities are dominant.

There are no absolute good or bad temperaments, and as long as they are within their normal ranges—reflected in physical and mental health—they are in a balanced, or normal, state. As each person's Mizaj differs from others, peoples' lifestyles will be different; this is the main essence of ITM in maintaining health and treating illnesses.

By adopting the kind of lifestyle that fits their Mizaj, one should try to keep the inherent warmness and humidity of their body in certain range, as per their main Mizaj, and avoid possible "mal-temperament".

Mizaj is not just confined to human beings. Every object, situation, and state in the world has a special and defined Mizaj.

=== Determining temperament ===
The tempers, or amzajeh, are classified into nine categories: moderate, warm, cold, wet, dry, warm and dry, warm and wet, cold and dry, cold and wet.

Some identifying behavioral and physical characteristics help to determine one's temperament.

==== Frame ====
- Being stout, sturdy, big-boned and prone to gain weight are signs of wetness, while not gaining weight and being thin are characteristics of dryness.

==== Body parts ====
- Bigger faces, fingers, lips, noses, organs, and body parts are defining characteristics of people with wet Mizaj, whereas people with dry Mizaj have smaller body parts.

==== Complexion ====
- A rosy and ruddy complexion is a sign of warmness and wetness, while having a yellow cast is sign of warmness and dryness; on the other hand, a light and fair complexion is a distinctive characteristic of people with wet and cold Mizaj. People with a dark complexion have a cold and dry Mizaj.

==== Hair ====
- People with dry Mizaj have coarse, curly and coiled hair; warmness causes the hair to grow faster. People with warm Mizaj have thick black hair, with thick density and more volume. Silky, straight, smooth, thin and fair hair which grows slower is a distinctive characteristic of people with cold Mizaj. Wetness would cause the hair to easily hold a curl or style.

==== Skin ====
- People with dry Mizaj have dry skin, and people with wet Mizaj have soft and squishy skin. People with cold Mizaj feel cold and run colder than other people, and the reverse is true for those with warm Mizaj.

==== Activity ====
- Warmness brings about an increase in exuberance and energy levels, which boost speech and body movement, while coldness causes the reverse symptoms, as people with cold Mizaj do not have much energy and are generally slow, and do not spend their time speaking and acting as much as people with warm Mizaj.

==== Mental traits ====
- People with warm Mizaj are normally more extroverted, sociable, and less patient, while people with cold Mizaj are more introverted, calmer, and more patient. People with warm Mizaj are more inclined to suffer stress and restlessness; however, people with cold Mizaj have a tendency to experience depression and melancholic thoughts and may have hallucinations or sometimes delusions.
- However, one's personality traits may be modified or changed due to various factors such as upbringing, religion, spirituality, and one's striving to change their attitude. Therefore, one's personality may not necessarily match their temperament.

==== Sensitivity ====
- People with warm Mizaj are more sensitive to warmness (surrounding environment, foods and drinks); those with cold Mizaj are more sensitive to coldness; those who have dry Mizaj are more sensitive to dryness and those with wet Mizaj are more sensitive to humidity.

==== Sleep ====
- Sleeping too much or sleepiness is a sign of wetness and needing less sleep is a defining characteristic of dryness.

==== Waste ====
- Waste (e.g. urine, sweat, and feces) in those with warm Mizaj have strong color and odor while in people with cold Mizaj the waste matters do not have a strong color or odor.

=== Everything has a temperament ===
==== Organs's temperament ====
All organs and body tissues have a specific Mizaj.

- Heart: The heart has a warm and dry temperament. The constant movement of the heart throughout one's life is determinant of its warmness. Consuming too much food with warm Mizaj such as pepper and spices results in palpitations. Having a fixed shape and being stiff and firm are signs of the heart's dryness.
- Brain: The brain, command center for the human nervous system, is cold and wet. The brain is composed of water in addition to the soft grey and white matter. The brain is capable of transmitting a great number of signals without failing. The way the brain is operating and its shape all are defining its cold and wet Mizaj. Consuming too many dairy products such as yogurt, water, or fruits and vegetables with high water content increase the coldness and humidity in the brain, which results in sleepiness and performance impairment.
- Blood, liver, muscles: These organs are warm and wet. They are pretty warm and flexible and in order to protect them, stay healthy, and keep on living one must consume meat, bread and sweet food items which all have a warm and wet Mizaj. However, overeating and consuming too much of these foods can cause a build-up of waste materials in these organs, which could manifest themselves with symptoms of polycythemia, fatty liver disease, muscle stiffness or inflammation in the muscles.
- Bones, teeth, fingernails, and hair: These all have cold and dry Mizaj. They are firm and rigid and in order to protect them and build strong bones, one must consume food with a cold and dry Mizaj, like essential minerals such as magnesium, calcium, zinc, or iron. Such minerals are found in Kashk, wheat and rice bran, almond, and barley. Due to their Mizaj, these organs are sensitive to coldness and dryness, and an overabundance of these could cause pain in cold weather, toothaches, and brittle hair and nails.

==== Colors temperament ====
Colors have temperament, meaning that they can reveal an object's temperament, or intensify the temperament of an individual.

The color yellow is the symbol of a warm and dry temperament, and red represents warm and wet Mizaj. On the other hand, dark colors such as black, grey, and brown symbolize cold and dry Mizaj, and bright colors such as white and blue are the symbols of cold and wet Mizaj.

Warm colors are signs of warmness and can increase the temperature in a confined area. These colors are associated with danger, threat, warning, and movement. They can increase the metabolism in the body and put it on alert.

Therefore, those with cold Mizaj who normally have a slow metabolism and feel sluggish should use warm colors for their clothes and houses, while people with warm Mizaj should do the reverse. People with a warm temperament who are normally vibrant, brisk, lively and stressed should avoid using warm colors, and use cool colors such as white, blue, and light green. Such cool hues can bring about a more passive reaction in the brain and can make a person feel pleased and relaxed. Accordingly, cool colors are not ideal to people with a cold temperament.

==== Seasons temperament ====
Each season has a defining temperament, so individuals should take special measures depending on the seasons.

- Spring: Spring is warm and wet. Individuals, especially those with warm and wet Mizaj, should avoid consuming sweets, fatty, greasy, and heavy food items with warm Mizaj during the spring.
- Summer: Summer is warm and dry. Abstaining from foods with warm Mizaj and sun exposure, using foods with cooling characteristics, and getting enough rest, particularly for people with warm and dry Mizaj, is highly recommended during summer.
- Autumn and winter: Autumn is cold and dry, and winter is cold and wet. Those with cold Mizaj should cut back on foods with cold Mizaj such as sour foods, dairy products and citrus fruits, and staying away from cold places is recommended to people with cold Mizaj. On the other hand, consuming sweets and foods with warming characteristics, getting exercise, and staying in warm places is of benefit to them.

==== Day and night hours ====
The amount of warmness and humidity fluctuate over days and nights, therefore different temperaments form: morning is cold and wet, before noon is warm and wet, the afternoon is warm and dry, and evening and night are cold and dry. The various Mizaj of the day and night are the reasons behind mood swings and pain or discomfort varying during the day and night.

==== Flavors ====
Flavors have temperaments and accordingly would cause warmness, coldness, dryness and wetness in the body. One can determine the Mizaj of a food item or a drink by taste alone.

Tasteless food items, also called watery, are cold and wet. Every insipid food item such as lettuce, dairy products such as yogurt, and citrus fruits, which are not very sour or sweet are cold and wet.

Sourness is cold and dry and causes dryness and coldness in the body as well. Vinegar and pickled vegetables, sour fruits or sour juices, and kashk are all cold and dry.

Salty, bitter and spicy flavors which are usually used to give foods a special taste are warm and dry, although spicy foods are warmer and drier than bitter and salty foods respectively.

Sweetness is warm and wet and most food items (including main dishes and high-calorie food) are classified in this group.

People with cold and dry Mizaj should avoid consuming sour foods and drinks or they can develop conditions such as dry skin, depression, and weakness.

The same goes for people with other temperaments, for instance, people with warm and wet Mizaj should cut back on sweet foods, people with warm and dry Mizaj should avoid using too much spice and salt, and people with cold and wet Mizaj should use dairy products, water and citrus fruits cautiously.

==== Climates ====
Each climate has its own unique temperament. In general, polar regions, mountainous areas with rocky landscapes, sandy grounds, and north winds, are cold and dry. Salt marshes and deserts are warm and dry. Coastal areas are cold and wet, while the tropics are warm and wet.

In Iran, southern, some eastern and mostly central areas which get the most sunlight and low humidity are warm and dry. Coastal areas in southern Iran and northern Iran (only during hot seasons) are warm and wet. Western and northwestern areas which are dominantly mountainous are cold and dry and coastal areas in northern Iran (except for warm seasons) are cold and wet.

The house orientation, whether the house is south-facing, north-facing, or built underground, determines the house temperament. North-facing houses (in Iran) with less sun exposure, underground houses, or houses built in damp and humid places are cold and wet or cold and dry. But south-facing houses which get enough sunlight and are built in warm places are normally warm and dry.

Even winds can develop a distinguishing temperament in an area. Winds blowing from northern and north western areas in Iran are cool and can cause a cold temperament, while winds blowing from southern areas are warm and develop a warm and wet temperament. Western and eastern winds are moderate and will not change the temperament very much.

The type of soil of an area is also important. Areas with loamy and clay soil which have great potential of retaining water are wet, while areas with chalky or sandy soil, composed of large particles which prevent it from retaining water, are warm and dry.

==== Psychiatric conditions ====
Any changes in the psychiatric condition affect a human's temperament to some extent. The longer the conditions are, the more dramatic and lasting the effects are. On the other hand, changes in one's temperament can influence psychiatric condition as well.

By releasing the heat from inside the body to the surface and vice versa, and by absorbing heat from the body's surface, such psychiatric conditions can cause warmness or coldness in the body.

Anger and excitement increase warmness and dryness in the body, and are the signs of dry and warm Mizaj, as someone with warm and dry Mizaj is more likely to get angry or excited. People who consume too much warm and dry food may be affected by anger and excitement more often.

Pleasure and worry are warm and wet, while fear, horror, and depression can be a result or sign of cold and dry—or in some cases cold and wet—Mizaj.

In order to maintain mental health one can both practice self-control and seek professional help. But adopting a lifestyle that suits one's Mizaj by consuming foods and drinks in accordance with their temperament is very important for good mental health.

If someone with warm Mizaj often eats food with warming characteristics, particularly during warm seasons, it is more likely for them to lose their temper. So in order to remain healthy, both physically and mentally, one should firstly reconsider and reform his or her lifestyle and diet, and then seek professional help or study more deeply about the situation.

==== Exercise, lack of movement ====
Moderate exercise increases the heart and breathing rate, excretes sweat which then evaporates off of the skin, and reduces stress. All these are symptoms of warm temperament which means exercise leads to warmness in the body.

High-intensity exercise drives the body to excessive coldness and weakness, and after heavy exercise the heart rate takes much longer to return to its base level, which is not healthy.

On the contrary, lack of movement slows the metabolism, and drives the temperament to coldness and wetness which is accompanied by weakness, lethargy, obesity, and puffiness.

Compared to light and mental exercises such as swimming and chess, vigorous and outdoor exercises such as football and running have a warmer and drier temperament.

In general, from the Iranian traditional medicine point of view, anaerobic exercises which consist of short exertion and high-intensity movements will mostly increase the heat in the body and will not decrease the wetness, so they best suit people with cold Mizaj and do not help in losing weight. On the other hand, exercises which are of light-to-moderate intensity and can be performed for extended periods of time will decrease the wetness and increase the heat in the body and therefore those with warm Mizaj who want to lose weight would benefit from such exercise.

==== Sleeping and wakefulness ====
Sleep is a passive, dormant part of our daily lives, while wakefulness is a daily recurring brain state and state of consciousness. Sleep is physical and mental rest, and wakefulness is physical and mental activity.

Therefore, the longer one stays up the drier and warmer their bodies get, and the longer one sleeps the wetter the brain and body gets, so their temperament would drop lower. While one is sleeping the body temperature drops, meaning that the heat moves from the surface of the body. During the day the heat moves to the surface of the body and the body temperature rises.

When one does not get enough sleep the brain and the body get warmer and drier, so in order to control the excessive warmness or dryness in the body one should cut back on warm and dry food. Taking a short nap during the day can also be beneficial.

Those with cold and wet Mizaj should not sleep as much. People with phlegmatic temperament should cut down on food items with a cold and wet temperament, to sleep for shorter periods and not having trouble waking up.

==== Age range ====
Although each person is born with a fixed and unique temperament, also called their inherent or main Mizaj, with the passage of time the main Mizaj is subject to fluctuation. For example, someone's Mizaj may get drier, but this does not mean that they are suffering mal-temperament.

Taking that into account, in addition to the main Mizaj, one must take note of the temperament of the age to stay healthy.

===== Growth period =====
- Based on Iranian traditional medicine, the time before the age of 25 to 30 is called the "growth period", with the preponderance of warmness and wetness. To keep teenagers and children healthy it is recommended to consume food stuff with warm and wet Mizaj. Eating bread, meat, rice with bran, and fruits is good for them. However, one should be careful to avoid excessive warmness.
- In this period one needs to consume more food and increase their nutrient intake. Eating diverse types of foodstuffs and high quality food is of importance to this age group.

===== Youth =====
- From age 30 to 40 is called "youth" when the wetness will dwindle and the warmness and dryness will be more dominant. One should not consume much food with warm and dry Mizaj as it increases the yellow bile in the body.
- Many people in this age group break out in pimples, get irritable, and suffer sleep deprivation. They should abstain from spices, pepper, spicy food, sweets, salty and deep fried food items. Instead they should eat food with cooling characteristics such as fruits, vegetable soups and dairy products to moderate the warmness and dryness in the body.
- During this age one has a strong digestive system, and can easily digest heavy foods like meat.

===== Middle age and old age =====
- Between the age 40 to 60, called "middle age", warmness and wetness will plummet, and coldness and dryness will be predominant in the body. After the age 60, also called "old age", abnormal wetness may occur in the body, so the Mizaj will become cold and wet. Due to the excessive wetness, for many old age is synonymous with puffy eyes and face, loose skin, drowsiness and loss of memory.
- In some other cases coldness and dryness will be more predominant in the body. The coldness and dryness affiliated with the old age would cause wrinkles, curvature of the spine, drop in body temperature, poor digestive system, and puffy eyes and face.
- Generally with old age comes a decrease in warmness and wetness and the temperament of people aging over 60 will get colder and drier compared to their main Mizaj.
- Due to their poor digestive system the elderly should abstain from fatty food, leftovers, deep fried foods, tomato paste and sauces, and fast food; and instead they should consume high calories and low volume foods. They should also cut back on water, dairy products, fruits with cooling characteristics, and sour food items.
- In order to avoid constipation, eating plums or figs which are soaked together and drinking sweet almond oil or olive oil is of benefit.
- Applying moderate oils such as sweet almond oil or violet oil (for people with warm inherent Mizaj) on the body surface is also good for these people. Wet cupping therapy is not recommended to these people unless a physician orders it in a special condition.

== Mal-temperament ==
Disturbing one's inherent or main Mizaj and moving towards excessive warmness, coldness, wetness or dryness, would undermine the persons' health. So one must take immediate action by recognizing the factors causing such symptoms, to prevent them from developing.

In the case where one fails to keep their Mizaj within its normal range for a long period of time, mal-temperament or 'So-e-Mizaj' will strike the body and diseases will progress.

=== Excessive warmness ===
There are cases when the patient is diagnosed with excessive warmness in their bodies. Reasons for this include:

- Heavy and fast exercise, or intense activity
- Great anger or happiness
- Being exposed to heat, either sun or fire, for a long time
- Consuming food with warming characteristics or warm Mizaj such as dates, peppers, etc.
- Clogged pores, which reduce sweat
- Infection and infectious diseases which cause fever and excessive body heat
- Having a warm temperament, as people with warm Mizaj are more prone to be affected by warm Mizaj food or warm environment than people with cold Mizaj

A fast heart rate, breaking out in pimples and mouth ulcers, and sleep deprivation are the side effects of excessive warmness.

=== Excessive coldness ===
Some actions or consuming some food stuff can contribute to excessive coldness in the body. These include:

- Lack of movement or not enough exercise
- Profound sadness or disturbing thoughts, which lead to sleep deprivation and restlessness
- Intense mental or physical activity, which will first increase the warmness, but will ultimately result in nutrient deficiency and lack of warmness in the body
- Being in cold, dark, and damp places
- Eating and drinking items with cold Mizaj or rubbing cold ointments for long time
- Taking too many showers or baths, which unclogs the pores, and then exercising
- Not eating enough, or going on a starvation diet
- Overeating, which slows digestion and decreases warmness in the stomach

People with cold Mizaj can be affected by mal-temperament caused by excessive coldness by consuming food with cold Mizaj.

=== Excessive dryness ===
Below is the list of reasons one might suffer conditions of excessive dryness:

- Factors contributing to increased warmness, such as being adjacent to fire, intense activities, or heavy exercise, which raise warmness and deplete the body of its natural humidity
- Being stressed out or overexcited, as well as being preoccupied and sleep deprived
- Dry climate and seasons such as summer and autumn, and residing in dry areas such as mountains and deserts
- Construction jobs or being in close contact with soil, stone and building materials
- Being in close contact with paint and solvents, especially painters and those working in labs
- Consuming food stuff with dry Mizaj such as vinegar or salt, or using volatile substances such as oil, gasoline, alcohol, ether, acetone, hair color or nail polish
- Long periods of fasting, as the body is unable to gain and maintain a normal level of humidity

Thin people with dry and cold or dry and warm Mizaj are more likely to suffer from excessive dryness.

=== Excessive wetness ===
On the other hand, some actions and eating some foods and drinks can lead to excessive wetness in the body. These include:

- Lack of movement and not exercising, which cause excessive wetness built up in the body
- Spending a long period of time in wet places, such as a bath or swimming pool
- Wet climate or seasons, such as spring and winter, or residing in coastal areas
- Being in close contact with water, for instance by working in paddy fields, teaching swimming, or being a lifeguard
- Consuming too much food and drink with wet Mizaj such as water, dairy products, or vinegar
- Overeating, as the digestive system is not capable of converting the food into energy properly, and unwanted materials and humidity will build up in the body
- Decrease in the amount of body waste discharged from the body, which causes excessive wetness in the body

Overweight people with wet Mizaj are more prone to suffer excessive wetness.

== Types of temperaments ==
In Iranian traditional medicine the excess or lack of warmness and humidity define four essential temperaments. These are "warm and wet (sanguine or Damawiy)", "warm and dry (choleric or Safrawiy)", "cold and dry (melancholic or Saudawiy)" and "cold and wet (phlegmatic or Balghamiy)". The terms in the parentheses refer to four groups of material in the body (called "humors" or 'Akhlat') including blood, yellow bile, black bile, and phlegm respectively. Words written in italic show original Persian terms in the ancient literature.

=== Choleric: warm and dry ===
- People with choleric temperament are usually tall and thin. They have a small frame, their fingers, lips, and other body parts are not large, and they are unlikely to get overweight.
- They have a dry and warm skin color with a yellow and sometimes peachy undertone.
- They have a rapid pulse, are exuberant, quickly finish what they are supposed to do – usually perfectly and carefully – and speak fast.
- People with warm and dry Mizaj have a naturally high body temperature.
- Due to the dryness of their Mizaj they might suffer constipation and waste matter (urine, sweat, and feces) discharged from their bodies usually has strong odor and color.
- Burning in the anus and urinary tract can be common among this group.
- Due to the warmness in their body they digest food quickly, and as they do not have adequate amount of nutrients to provide for the energy needs of the body, they get hungry quickly.
- Their mouth gets dry quickly.
- Due to the warmness in their body which moves upward to the head, their hair grows faster. They have coarse thick black hair. Premature graying and hair loss is prevalent among these people.
- As they are able to think fast and act fast, they may lose some concentration abilities.
- They have keen senses and can easily notice the smallest changes in smells, voices, tastes, and colors.
- They are overly sensitive and will be easily upset or offended.
- They function well on low amounts of sleep. They are not very sound sleepers and are prone to suffer stress, anxiety, and sleep deprivation.
- They are idealist and fond of efficiency. They are also in favor of punctuality.

=== Sanguine: warm and wet ===
- People with sanguine temperament are normally sociable and cheerful. They are usually in high spirits, patient, and adaptable.
- They have a rosy complexion and soft and smooth skin. They also have thick black hair, with thick density and more volume.
- People with a sanguine temperament are stout, sturdy, and burly with a muscular body.
- These people have bigger veins which are prominent and easily seen through the skin in the arms and legs. They also have a more powerful and stronger pulse.
- They rarely get sick, however, they are more prone to develop conditions such as obesity, hypertension, blood clots, high cholesterol, and high uric acid.
- Drowsiness, particularly in spring, is common among people with sanguine temperament.
- They are more likely to develop acne.
- They are good leaders.
- They have a good appetite and a craving for meat, bread, and rice.
- Waste matter discharged from their bodies have usually strong color and odor. As they consume food in large quantities they expel more body waste.

=== Melancholic: Cold and Dry ===
- People with a melancholic temperament are usually thin and have a small frame. They do not have large body parts and they do not gain weight.
- They have a dark complexion and are likely to develop dark spots on their skin. Their skin is dry and rough and is prone to get wrinkles and show signs of premature skin aging.
- Their hair is coarse, curly and coiled. They also have excessive unwanted hair.
- People with a melancholic temperament tend to be introspective and introverted. They act and speak unhurriedly, and might need more time to accomplish a task, but they do it well.
- They might have negative thoughts. They can be perceived as cynical, skeptic, distrustful and suspicious, and are more likely to develop mental disorders such as depression. They are also likely to have more nightmares than other people.
- They do not sleep much, have trouble falling asleep fast, and they have a lower sleep efficiency which might cause disturbed sleep. They have a retentive memory.
- They are much more likely to suffer constipation and dry skin. Body waste discharged from their bodies might become dark in color.
- They are not in favor of change.
- They are sensitive to foods and drinks with a cold and dry temperament, and they have to cut down on pickled fruits and vegetables, foods with vinegar content, lentils, eggplants, and fast food.

=== Phlegmatic: Cold and Wet ===
- People with phlegmatic temperament usually feel cold and run colder than other people.
- They are light, fair and smoothed-complexioned, and relatively speaking they have glowing skin. They have silky, straight, smooth and thin hair. They do not have much unwanted hair.
- Their body parts are large. They are normally bulky and quickly gain weight with a body composition of larger proportions of fat rather than muscle tissue, and they usually seem swollen. They take their time thinking, speaking and acting.
- They oversleep and when they get up they feel they have not slept enough. They usually have trouble waking up and they wake up tired.
- These people are prone to wake up with swollen feet, hands and puffy face specially after sleeping in the evening.
- They feel dizzy and tired in the early morning, particularly when it is cold or they have consumed food or drinks with wet Mizaj such as yogurt.
- They usually are more sensitive to cold and humid weather. They are sensitive to dairy products, sour foods, large amounts of water, and high-water-content foods and should cut back on them.
- Due to the wetness of their bodies and brains, they tend to have a poorer and shorter memory compared to people of other temperaments, as wetness and coldness result in a decrease in transferring and storing data.
- People with cold and wet Mizaj are patient and calm.
- They expel a fairly large amount of waste matter, but the waste does not have a strong color or odor unless waste materials have built up in their bodies.
- They do not have a strong pulse, neither do they have prominent veins. They also tend to suffer low blood pressure.

== Humors ==
Humors, or 'Akhlat', are liquid humours formed in the liver and gastrointestinal system following digestion.

Afterwards the substances move towards the liver and will be processed again (called the second digestion in traditional medicine) and will form the four liquid humors: blood, yellow bile, black bile, and phlegm.

The gastrointestinal tract, also known as digestive tract, plays an important role in one's health and it is said that all diseases begin in the gut. The four aforesaid humours, or Akhlat, are supposed to supply the cells and the body organs with necessary nutrients.

Therefore, the healthier the humors are, the healthier the body. Selecting healthy foods in accordance with the main Mizaj (temperament) to aid digestion keeps one healthy. Excessive amounts of blood, yellow bile, black bile, and phlegm is rooted from the fact that someone has not stuck to a healthy diet.

In the Iranian traditional medicine 'abstaining' is the best path to effective treatment. According to a saying by Razi, once you are aware of the detrimental effects of a food item you should abstain from it and it is wise "not to choose your desire over your body's comfort".

=== Mizaj in the humors ===
In ITM everything in this world has Mizaj, and Akhlat are no exception. Akhlat can be also examined according to their warmness and humidity :

- Yellow bile is warm and dry, if it increases in the body, the body will become warmer and drier
- Blood is warm and wet, excessive blood will increase the warmness and humidity in the body
- Black bile is cold and dry, with copious amounts of black bile the body will get drier and colder
- Phlegm is cold and wet, high amounts of phlegm in the body will raise the coldness and humidity in the body

=== Yellow bile ===
- Yellow bile is not as abundant as phlegm and blood in the body. It is the lightest of all humors. It resembles cooking foam. Yellow bile acts as a diluent and facilitates the transfer of blood and nutrients from capillaries to the remote body organs.
- It is also in charge of the metabolization of fats and lipids, and eases digestion. Yellow bile is tasked with cleaning up the digestive system, vascular tissues, and genitalia. That is why people with excessive yellow bile might experience burning sensation with urination or defecation, frequent urination, frequent bowel movements, and heavy or prolonged menstrual bleeding.
- Thick or viscous blood cannot effectively flow into the small vessels and capillaries and provide the tissues with sufficient oxygen and nutrients, so it can cause fatigue, along with bruising or discoloration, cold feet, and cold hands. Yellow bile stops such health conditions by improving blood circulation, as its job is to accelerate the transfer of blood and nutrients in the body. Being hot and dry, yellow bile is accompanied with movement and motion rather than immobility.

==== Excessive yellow bile symptoms ====
- Yellowing of the skin and eyes; feeling bitter taste in mouth; getting acne on the face or the scalp; having dry skin, eyes, mouth, nasal passages and bad breath; getting wrinkles; dark circles under the eyes; losing appetite; feeling nauseated, itching, burning, and irritation in genitalia or rectum; getting thin; feeling unquenchable thirst; troubled sleep; sleep deprivation; feeling stressed out; pins-and-needles sensation in fingers and/or toes and strong smelling waste materials (urine, sweat, menstrual blood) are some of the symptoms which appear by excessive yellow bile.

=== Blood ===
"Blood" is the most abundant and most important humor in the body, which is formed by eating food. The humor of "blood" is necessary for growth, especially in children and teenagers, when their growth spurt happens. So they need larger amounts of "blood" by consuming foods which will produce this humor in the body.

A great deal of the bloodstream is made up of the humor of "blood", which is warm and wet.

==== Excessive "blood" symptoms ====
- Similar to any other humour excessive amounts of "Blood" will cause discomfort or even serious illnesses. Dizziness, lightheadedness, frequent yawning, fatigue, red and bloodshot eyes, redness of the face and lips, blood filled pimples, abscess especially on the hips, genitalia or anus, bleeding of the gums while brushing your teeth, frequent nosebleeds, high blood pressure, losing mental acuity, a sweet taste in the mouth specially in the morning, heavier than normal or prolonged menstrual bleeding, itching, and hot and moist skin are of the symptoms of excessive "Blood".

=== Black bile ===
- Black bile is cold and dry. It is sparse, but it is essential for the body. The right amounts of black bile keep bones healthy and strong and bones, teeth and tendons primarily live off black bile.
- Normal amounts of black bile also support hair and nails. Black bile strengthens body parts, therefore a lack of black bile in the body will compromise bone strength and the tendon's function. In a worst-case scenario it can lead to osteoporosis. Its shortage can also cause tooth decay and hair loss. Black bile also stimulates appetite when the stomach is empty.

==== Excessive black bile symptoms ====
- Darkening of the skin, developing brown skin patches, wrinkles, having dull skin, developing dark circles under your eyes, suffering muscle cramps (specially muscles of the posterior leg and toes during sleep), more painful menstrual cramps, irregular menstrual cycle, having depressing and negative thoughts, poor sleep, having nightmares, darker waste materials (sweat, urine), constipation, fake hunger, thicker and darker blood, having excessive unwanted hair, getting thinner, developing mental disorder such as depression, obsession, isolation, skepticism, and cynicism are symptoms of built up excessive or abnormal black bile in the body.

=== Phlegm ===
- After the humor of blood, phlegm is the second most abundant humor in the body. It has a cold and wet Mizaj.
- Phlegm is a slimy liquid very much like water (colorless, odorless and tasteless) and it can be found in body parts such as the dermis, adipose tissue (body fat), synovial fluid, and the mucus lining the lungs, throat, mouth, and nose, which require humidity and flexibility to function properly.
- The cerebrospinal fluid in the brain and spinal cord is also made up of phlegm.
- Maintaining or improving flexibility is owed to the humor of phlegm.

==== Excessive phlegm symptoms ====
- Feeling heavy, especially the eyelids and the head, getting puffy and swollen, feeling cold (in contrast with people with sanguine temperament), breaking into cold sweat, getting sweaty palms, getting pale, not feeling thirsty or feeling false thirst, increased mucus production (getting runny nose or watery eyes), stringy or thick saliva, weakness, weakened muscle, sagging of skin, sleepiness, having trouble waking up especially in damp places or cities with high humidity and during cold seasons, memory loss, dizziness, difficulty learning or remembering something, having difficulty digesting food, bloating, frequent urination, sour burp, and diarrhea are the symptoms of excessive phlegm in the body.
- Joint making cracking sounds can be a symptom of lack of phlegm. Joints, and respiratory and digestive tracts function healthily with sufficient amounts of phlegm.

== Iranian traditional medicine and eye health ==
The recommendations of ITM for preventing eye diseases can be classified with respect to the mechanism associated with the negative effects on eyes:

- Some of the factors may directly cause dry eye, including gazing in a fire for a long time, too much crying, or gazing at bright objects. However, some factors may cause dry eye following body dehydration. Those factors include edible substances such as salty and hot foods, insufficient sleep, too much sexual activity, and too much perspiration.
- Factors that cause Emtela including lack of physical activity, insufficient exercise, incomplete digestion of food, overeating, or eating foods before digestion of the previous meal can cause accumulation of wastes in the eyes and may result in eye fatigue.
- Concentrating factors: oversleeping or eating beef can cause concentration of moisture inside the body. Those factors slow down blood flow inside the eye tissue followed by poor vision.
- Factors that may cause flatulence and gas including peas, beans, vegetables and horseradish, and drinking cold water with foods cause excessive vapor inside the body, including eye tissues, and impair the natural functions of the eye.

== See also ==
- Ancient Iranian medicine
- Avicenna
- Joseph Labrosse (Carmelite)
- I'jaz
- Islamic attitudes towards science
- Islamic views on evolution
- Islamic view of miracles
- Medical Encyclopedia of Islam and Iran
- Medicine in the medieval Islamic world
- Muhammad ibn Zakariya al-Razi
- Prophetic medicine
- Rhazes
- Traditional Knowledge Digital Library
- Unani medicine
