= Ulueren =

Ulueren is a surname. Notable people with the surname include:

- Melih Ulueren (born 1955), Turkish diplomat
- Serhat Ulueren (born 1969), Turkish sports reporter
