= Abu Bakr Rabee Ibn Ahmad Al-Akhawyni Bokhari =

10th-century Persian physician and author

Abu Bakr Rabee Ibn Ahmad Al-Akhawayani Bokhari (Al-Akhawayni Bokhari)

Personal life
- Died: 983 CE Bokhara, Ancient Iran
- Era: Islamic golden age
- Main interest: Iranian Islamic traditional medicine
- Notable work: Hidayat al-Muta`allemin Fi al-Tibb

Religious life
- Religion: Islam

Abu Bakr Rabee Ibn Ahmad Al-Akhawayni Bokhari (Al-Akhawyni Bokhari) was a Persian physician, surgeon and the author of the Hidayat al-Muta`allemin Fi al-Tibb, the oldest document in the history of Iranian traditional medicine. He lived during the Golden Age of Iranian-Islamic medicine and his book was used as a reference text for medical students long after his death. Al-Akhawayni Bokhari wrote about anatomy, physiology, pathology, pharmacology, signs, symptoms, treatment of the disease and surgery of tumors, urine stones, eyes, knee, bones, etc. His reputation was based on the treatment of patients with mental illnesses.

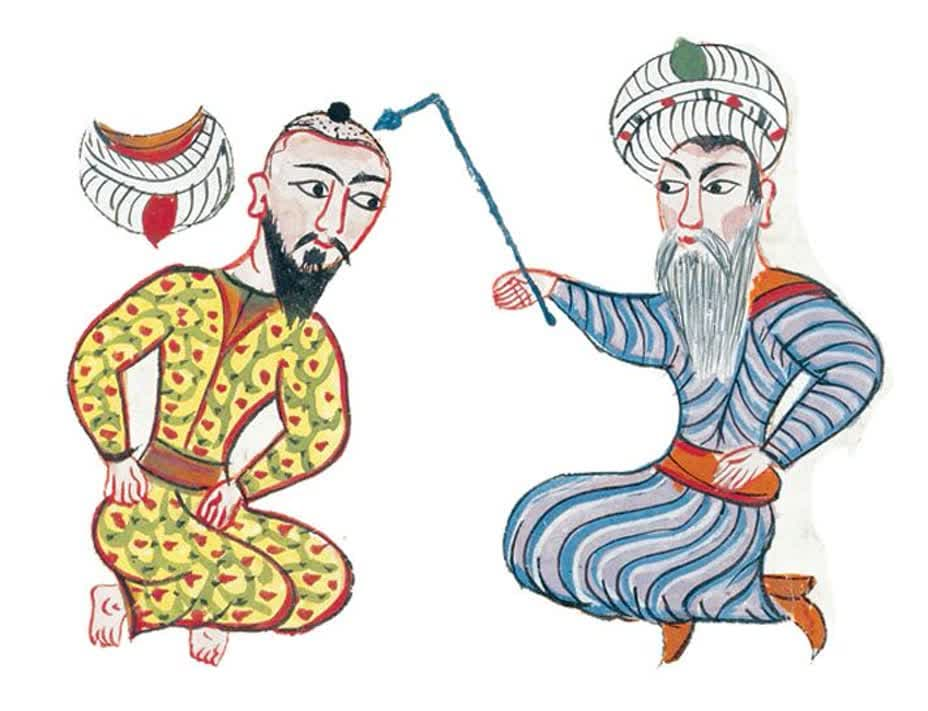
Head surgery

His name was Rabī and his father was Ahmad and his nickname was Abu Bakr, known as Pezeshk Aķhawayinī Abu Hakim, He was an Iranian physician of Farārud and son of Ahmad, in the 4th century AH. His other names that have arisen incorrectly during transcription (copying) are: Ajwīni. Akhwin, Akhwāi. Akharbi. Little is known about his life. He was born in Bukhara and was a student of Abul-Qasim Moqane'i, who was a student of Abu Bakr al-Razi. He himself says that: "I cured a lot of melancholy patients and they became so enamored of me that they called me The madman's doctor!" The book Hedayat fi al-Tibb has been copied several times by others. The second time was at the end of Rabi al-Awwal 478 AH (5th of Mordad 464 AH), then in 520 AH, and again in 1297 AH. Professor Mujtaba Minovi mentioned this book in the magazine Yaghma in 1329 AH, and then, with the hard work and perseverance of Dr. Jalal Matini, it was edited in 1344 AH and published by Mashhad University Press.

An Iranian physician and surgeon who lived in 900 CE and has written The Text Book of medicine for medicine students

Professor Minoui's assumption is that since Akhawayni declared himself a student of Abu al-Qasim Tahir ibn Muhammad ibn Ibrahim Makhani and Abu al-Qasim Makhani was a student of Abu Bakr al-Razi (d. 313 AH), then Akhawayni's death date would have been around the year 360 solar (373 lunar: 983 CE). Perhaps this is why Akhawayni mentioned in his book physicians who lived in the third and fourth centuries and not after (Abu al-Qasim Makhani, Razi, Hippocrates, Galen, Yaqub ibn Ishaq al-Kindi, Thabit ibn Qara, Isa ibn Sahar al-Bakht, ibn Sarabiyun, Yahya ibn Masuyyah, Aharon, and …).

Therefore, it can be said that around the year 300 Solar year (910 CE), Abu Bakr was born in Bukhara. He entered the school of physician Abu Bakr al-Razi as a young man and through perseverance and trial and error became the leading physician of his time. He used special surgical tricks and techniques that are still surprising after a thousand years.

His teachings and treatments range from the cervical vertebrae reduction with a pincer to his innovation of feeding tube with the hollowed-out horn of a cow (which is now called gavage tube). In his book, he taught many things, from breast cancer surgery and nasal masses, joints and bones surgery to the removal of urinary stones with a catheter, abdominal herniorrhaphy or return of a prolapsed uterus, eye enucleationof in pus-filled eye, pterygium surgery, and knee surgery. At the request of his son, he immortalized his 30 years of work experience in the book "Hidayat al-Mu'talimin fi'l-Tibb" (which can be translated as "Text Book for post graduated Medical Doctors"). In this book, He has pointed out where he has failed. He also used the case report method and review study in his book, sometimes mentioning the names of patients and doctors.

After his death, another child was born in the same city of Bukhara, named Avicenna (Pursina) the Great, who followed the path of Pezeshk Akhawayni.
