= Haydarpaşa Breakwater =

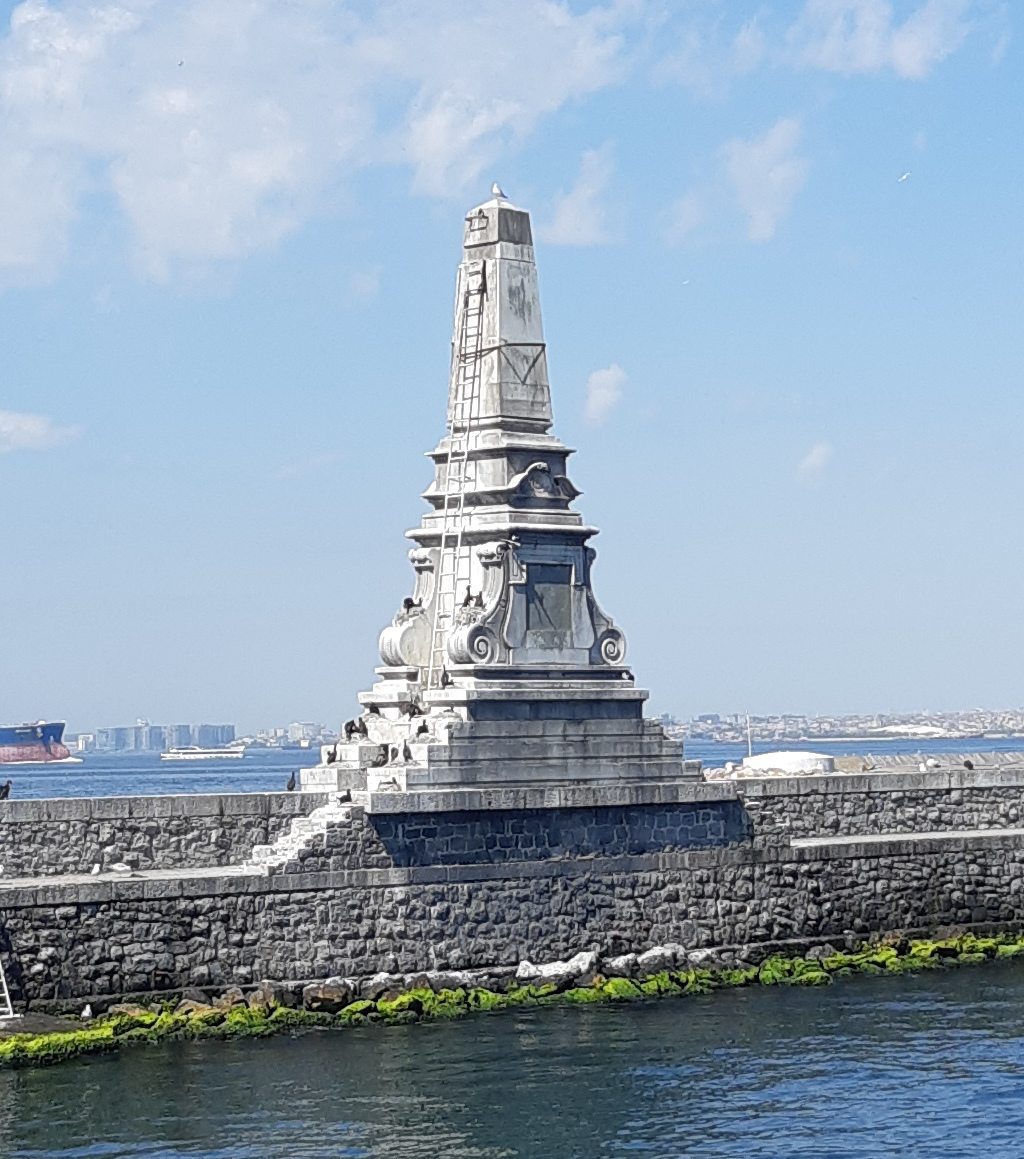
- Interactive map of the Haydarpaşa Breakwater area

General information
- Location: Kadıköy, Sea of Marmara, Istanbul, Turkey
- Coordinates: 40°59′46″N 29°00′57″E
- Completed: 1902

Design and construction
- Architect: Alexander Vallaury

Abdul Hamid II Monument or Haydarpaşa Breakwater, is a monument located on the breakwater opposite Istanbul Haydarpaşa railway station. The monument was built by the architect Alexander Vallaury in honor of the 25th anniversary of Abdul Hamid II's accession to the throne. The monument, made entirely of marble, was completed in 1902 and inaugurated on the 21st of September, Abdul Hamid II's birthday.

== About ==
There is a tughra and an inscription on the land side of the monument, and a coat of arms on the sea side. Today, the tugra, coat of arms and inscription on the monument are not original.
