= Hidayat Jafarov =

Azerbaijani archaeologist (born 1946)

- Azerbaijani: Hidayət Fərrux oğlu Cəfərov
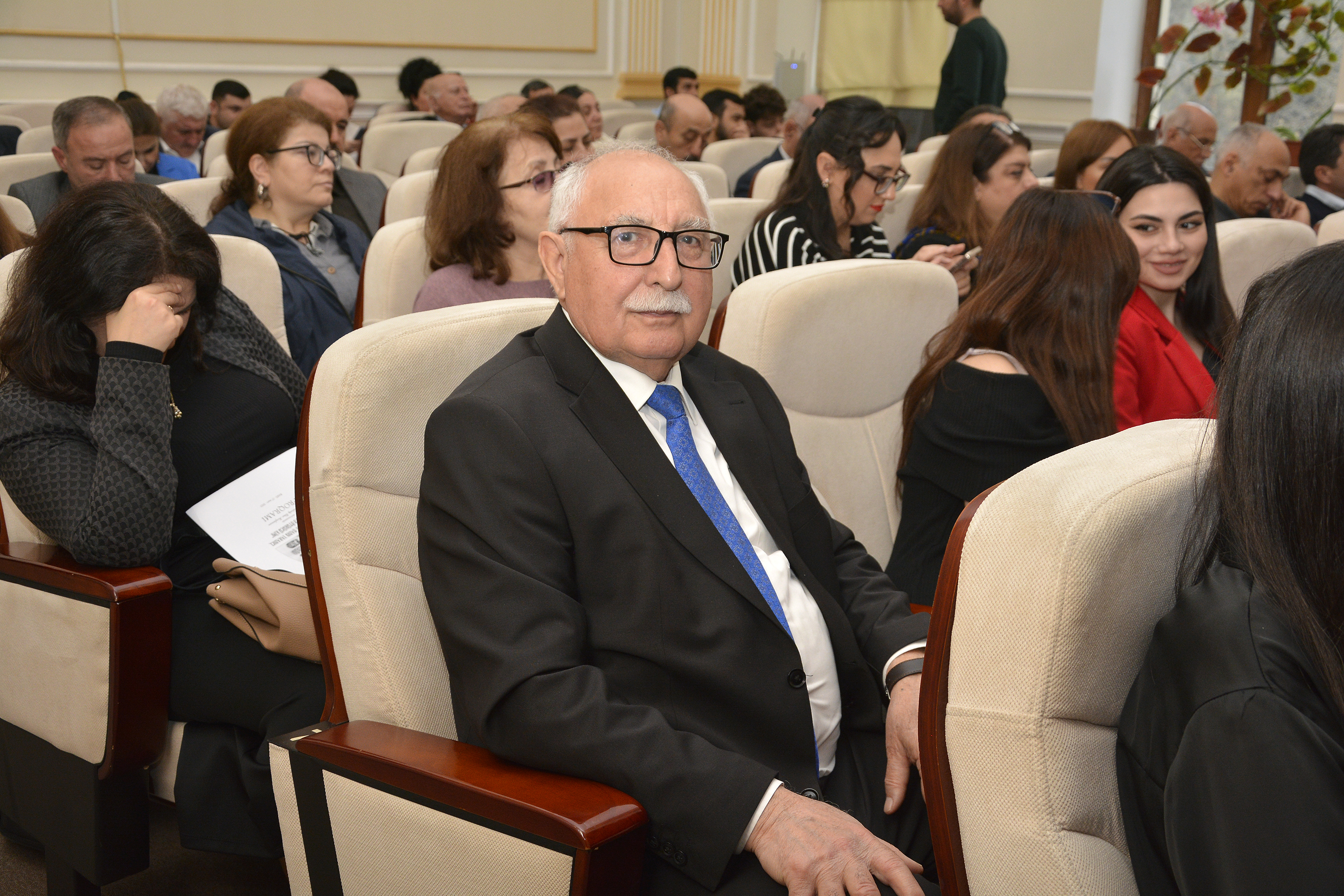
- Born: September 8, 1946 (age 80); Alinazirli, Beylagan District, Azerbaijan
- Citizenship: Soviet Union; Azerbaijan
- Education: Azerbaijan State Pedagogical University
- Alma mater: Azerbaijan State Pedagogical Institute named after V.I.Lenin
- Known for: archaeologist, pedagogue
- Children: 2
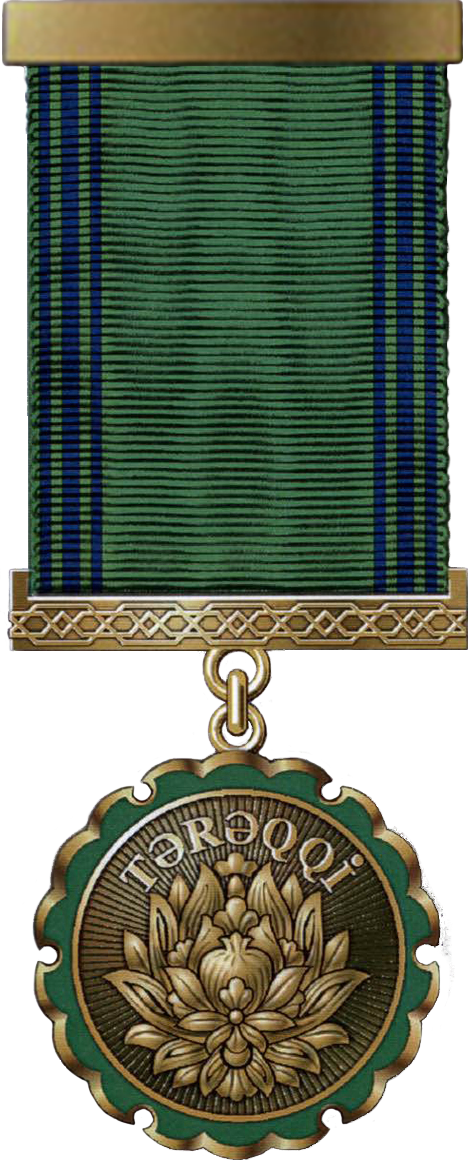
- Awards: Honored Teacher of the Republic of Azerbaijan (2006) Taraggi Medal (2011)
- Scientific career
- Fields: archaeology, history
- Workplaces: Institute of Archaeology and Anthropology of ANAS; Azerbaijan State University of Economics
- Thesis: The Bronze and Early Iron Age Culture of the Gargarchay and Terterchay Basins (1996)
- Doctoral advisor: Ideal Narimanov

Hidayat Jafarov (Azerbaijani: Hidayət Fərrux oğlu Cəfərov; 6 September 1946) — archaeologist, doctor of historical sciences, professor. Honored Teacher of the Republic of Azerbaijan (2006); laureate of the "Taraggi Medal" (2011); chief researcher of the department "Middle and Late Bronze Age Archaeology" of the Institute of Archaeology and Anthropology of the Azerbaijan National Academy of Sciences; member, group leader, expedition leader of the Ganja-Gazakh archaeological expedition in 1971–1979; deputy head of field research of the “Karabakh” archaeological expedition since 1980, expedition leader since 2008; professor of the “Humanities” department of the Azerbaijan State University of Economics.

== Early life and education ==
Hidayat Jafarov was born on September 8, 1946, in the village of Alinazirli, Beylagan district. In 1953–1961, he finished the 8-year school of Ashikhli village of Beylagan district, and in 1961–1964, he studied at Beylagan city secondary school No. 1 and finished it.

In 1964–68, he studied at the Faculty of History of the present Azerbaijan State Pedagogical University and graduated from that Institute with honors diploma. Until December 1968, he worked as a teacher and then as deputy director for educational affairs at Alinazirli village secondary school of Beylagan district, and in 1968–1969, he served in the Soviet army.

== Career ==
Hidayat Jafarov began working as a senior laboratory assistant in the department "Ancient Archaeology" of the Institute of History of the Academy of Sciences of the Azerbaijan SSR in 1970. From June 1, 1971, he was promoted to the position of junior researcher, and from 1971 to 1974, he got postgraduate education in the specialty "Archaeology" at the Institute of History of the Academy of Sciences of the Azerbaijan SSR. In March 1978, he successfully defended his dissertation on the topic "Relations of Azerbaijan with the countries of Western Asia in the Late Bronze and Early Iron Ages" at the Specialized Scientific Council of the Institute of Archaeology and Ethnography of the Academy of Sciences of the Armenia SSR.

In 1974–1975, he worked as a deputy chief laboratory assistant at the department of Archaeology and Ethnography of the Institute of History of the Azerbaijan Academy of Sciences, in 1975-1980 he was a junior researcher, and in 1980-1989-a chief researcher in the same department. In 2007-2023 he worked as the head of the department "Eneolithic and Early Bronze Age Archaeology" of the Institute of Archaeology and Ethnography of ANAS. Currently, he is the chief researcher at the department "Middle and Late Bronze Age Archaeology" of the Institute of Archaeology and Anthropology of ANAS.

Hidayat Jafarov, who participated in various archaeological expeditions (Ganja-Gazakh, Dashkesan, Mugan, Shamkir, Mil-Karabakh) since 1971, headed the Shamkir Archaeological Expedition in 1978. In 1979, he was the deputy head of that expedition, and in 1980–1988, the deputy head of the Mil-Karabakh archaeological expedition, and the head of the 2nd team. Since 2008, he has been leading the field research of the "Karabakh" archaeological expedition at the Institute of Archaeology and Ethnography of ANAS. Under his participation and direct leadership, dozens of archaeological monuments of various periods and types have been recorded in the Ganja-Gazakh, Mugan, and Karabakh regions of Azerbaijan. Large-scale archaeological research has been conducted in many of them, especially in the Khojaly, Borsunlu, Beyimsarov and Sarychoban kurgans in Karabakh. Many years of fruitful field research have been reflected in the scientist's numerous scientific works. The problem of cultural and economic relations between Azerbaijan and the countries of the Near East, the study of ethnic and cultural processes in the Late Bronze and Early Iron Ages, the issues of the first large social system in Azerbaijan, and others occupy a special place in his research.

In 1996, he defended his doctoral dissertation on the topic "The Bronze and Early Iron Age Culture of the Gargarchay and Terterchay Basins" at the Specialized Scientific Council under the Faculty of History of Baku State University.

Jafarov for a long-time was a member of the History Department of the Higher Attestation Commission under the President of the Republic of Azerbaijan. He is a member of the Scientific Council of the Institute of Archaeology and Anthropology of the Azerbaijan National Academy of Sciences and the History Department of the Scientific and Methodological Council of the Ministry of Education of the Republic.

Jafarov has been a teacher at the Azerbaijan State University of Economics since 1989. In 1989–1996, he worked as a head teacher, associate professor, and hold the chair of the "History of Azerbaijan" of the Azerbaijan State University of Economics. In June 1997, he was elected to the position of professor at the chair "History of Azerbaijan" of the same university, and since June 1998, he was the acting head of the sub-faculty and in 1999, 2001, 2006, and 2011, he was elected to the position of the head of the sub-faculty "History of Azerbaijan" through a competition and worked in this position until July 2016.

== Scientific works ==
Jafarov's scientific works on Google Scholar have been cited 50 times, with an H-index of 4 and an i10-index of 3. Jafarov has 11 publications. His scientific activities are mainly focused on the study of the Bronze Age archaeology of Azerbaijan, including the archaeological heritage of the Karabakh region. His research interests include the study of kurgans, burial customs, early urban culture, and the Khojaly-Gedabey culture.

== Awards ==
In 2006, Jafarov was awarded the honorary title of "Honored Teacher of the Republic of Azerbaijan" by the decree of the President of the Republic of Azerbaijan Ilham Aliyev, and in 2011 he was awarded the "Taraggi Medal".
