= Alexandre Vallaury =

Franco-Ottoman architect (1850–1921)

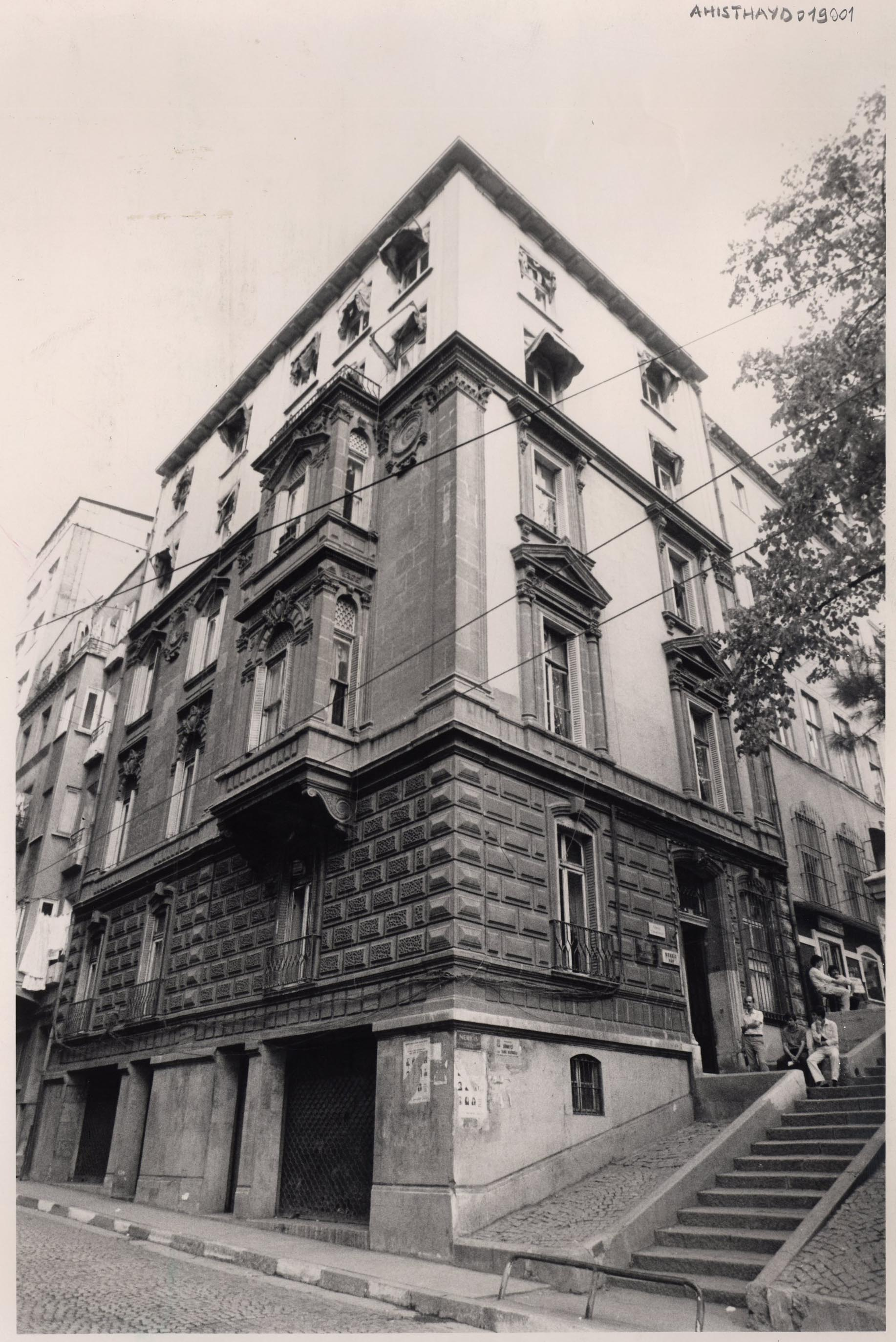
Décugis House, Beyoğlu, Istanbul

Alexandre Vallaury (1850–1921) was a Franco-Ottoman architect who established architectural education in the Ottoman Empire at the School of Fine Arts in Constantinople. Nicknamed "architect of the city" (Ottoman Turkish: Mimar-ı Şehir) by Osman Hamdi Bey, Vallaury, alongside his collaborator and palace architect Raimondo D'Aronco, was a leading practitioner of Orientalist eclecticism.

== Biography ==
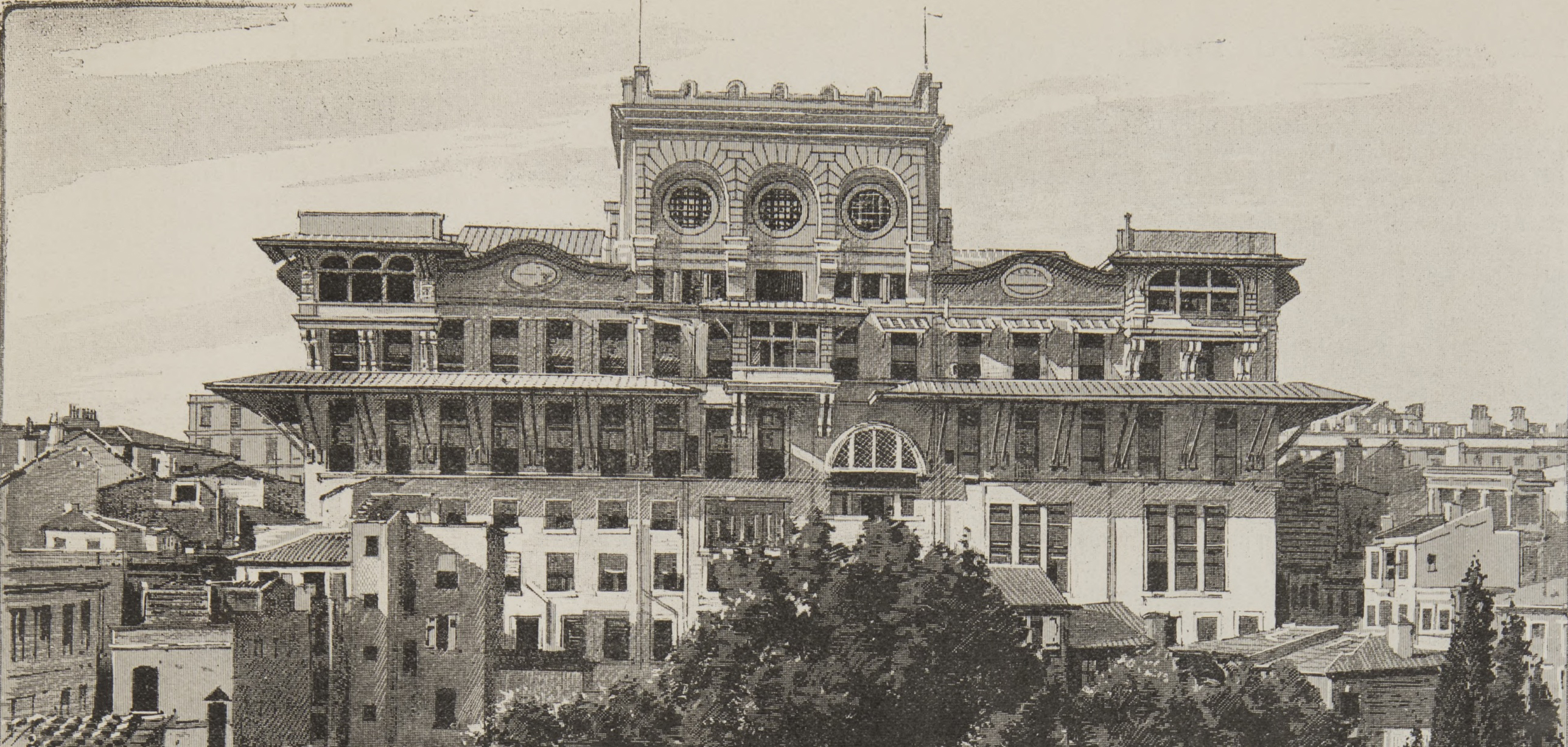
Ottoman Bank Headquarters

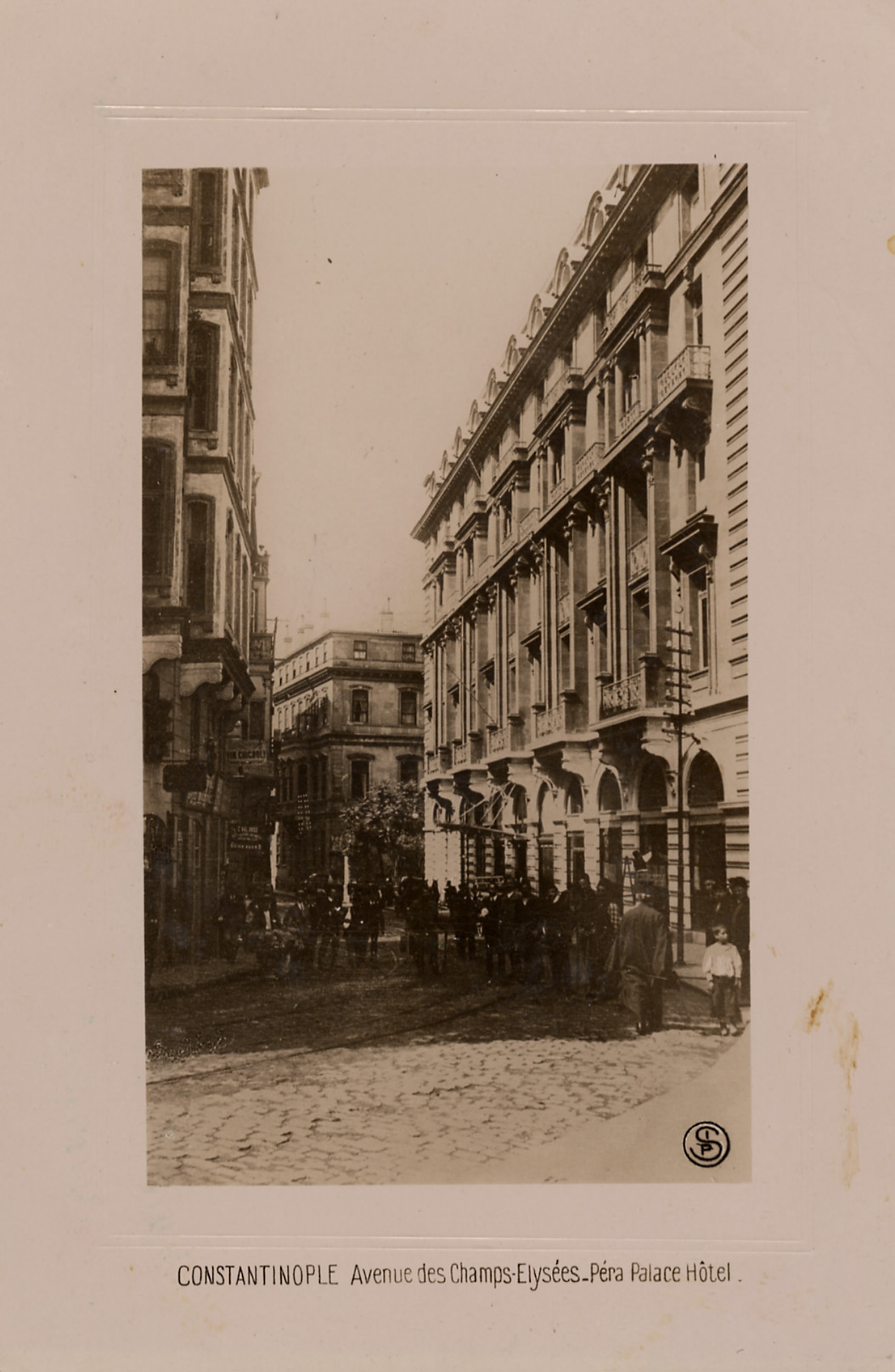
Pera Palace Hotel

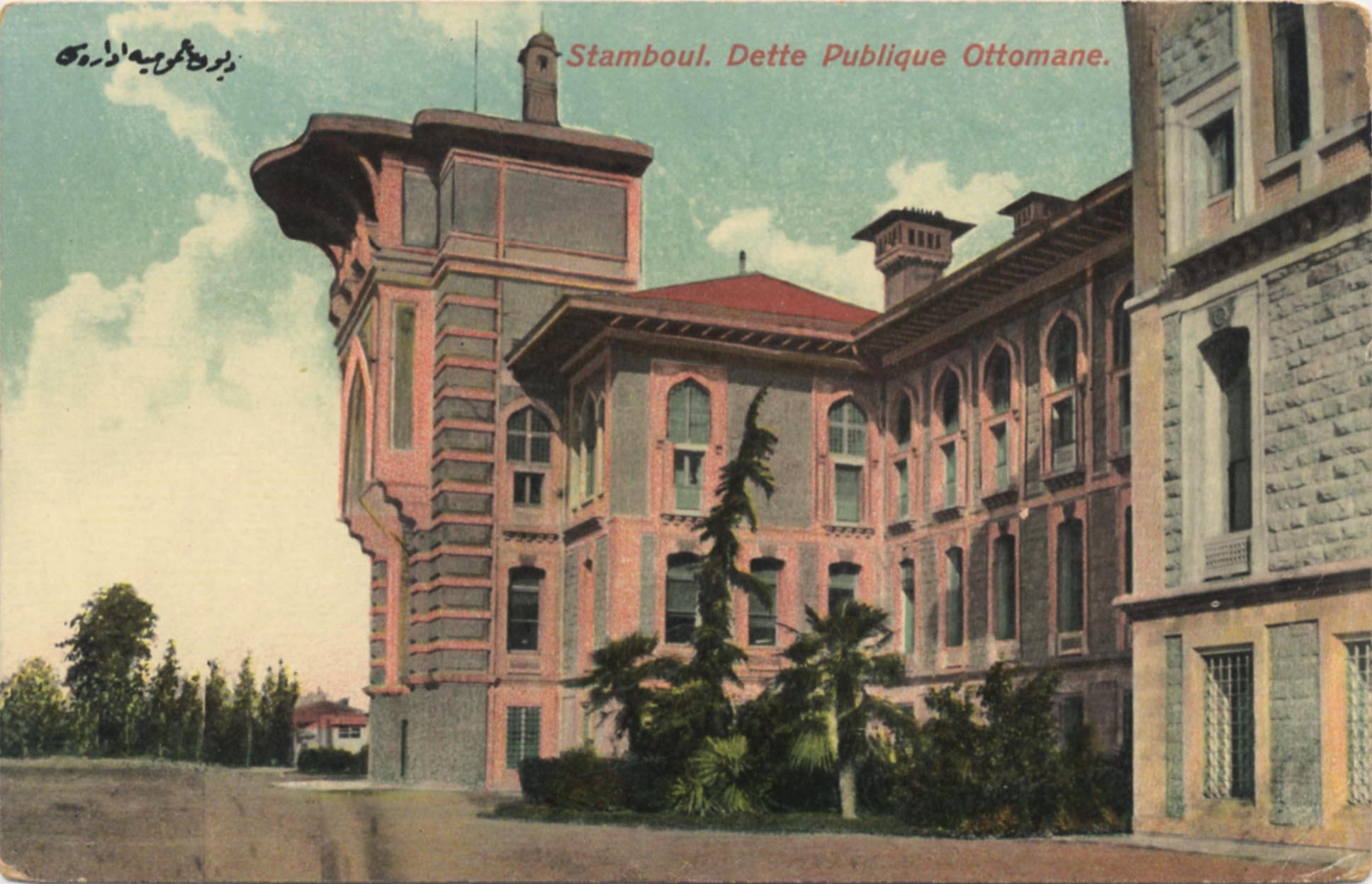
Postcard of the Ottoman Public Debt Administration building, currently the Istanbul High School

Vallaury (also spelled Vallauri) was born in 1850 into a Levantine family in Istanbul. His father, Francesco Vallauri, was a renowned pastry chef from Nice, highly respected in court circles. Vallaury's nationality is not definitively known; he was born in modern day Istanbul and, as his family emigrated from Nice at a time when the city was still under piedmontese rule, he is assumed to have been of both Franco-Levantine or Italian-Levantine extraction due to his affinity to both cultures.

Between 1869 and 1878, Vallaury lived in Paris, France, where he studied architecture at the École nationale supérieure des Beaux-Arts. Returning to Istanbul in 1880, he met Osman Hamdi Bey, who was at that time curator of the newly established Imperial Museum (Turkish: Müze-i Humayun - now the Istanbul Archaeology Museum), during an exhibition of his relief drawings of various architectural monuments. The two artists worked closely together in the fields of archaeology, museum work and education in fine arts.

Following the foundation of the first School of Fine Arts (Turkish: Sanayi-i Nefise Mektebi, now the Mimar Sinan Fine Arts University) in Turkey on January 1, 1882, Alexandre Vallaury started working in the architecture department. He lectured at the school for 25 years until his retirement in 1908.

Following the 1894 Istanbul earthquake, he was appointed to work on various commissions for city planning. Remembered by Osman Bey as the "City Architect" (Mimar-ı Şehir), Vallaury was almost invariably the architect chosen by the upper echelons of Ottoman high officials and French business circles while he worked at the School of Fine Arts. On some of these projects, he worked with the Italian architect Raimondo D'Aronco, the chief architect at the sultan's palace.

In 1896, he was awarded France's Legion of Honour to go with many other medals and awards from the French and Ottoman governments.

Vallaury combined traditional Ottoman architecture with elements of Beaux-Arts architecture in the buildings he designed for members of the palace and for high officials in Istanbul. His architecture showed great variety, drawing on a broad spectrum of styles from Islamic-Ottoman synthesis to Neoclassical architecture. He used motifs from international Orientalism for some Neo-Renaissance and Neo-Ottoman structures which often incorporated Neo-Baroque and Art Nouveau details. His workshop was located at Saint Pierre Han in Galata.

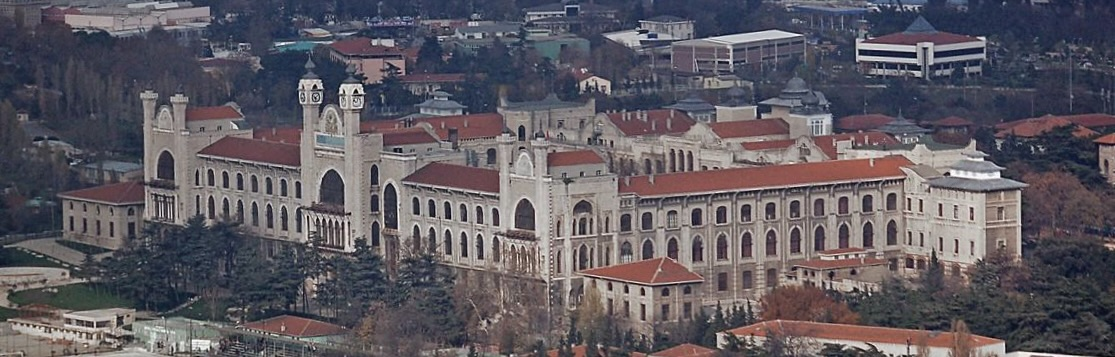
Imperial College of Medicine (Ottoman Turkish: Mekteb-i Tıbbiye-i Şâhâne), currently the Haydarpaşa Hamidiye Campus of the University of Health Sciences (until 2015 the Haydarpaşa Campus of Marmara University) in the Kadıköy district of Istanbul. The building was designed by architects Alexandre Vallaury and Raimondo D'Aronco.

== Notable works ==
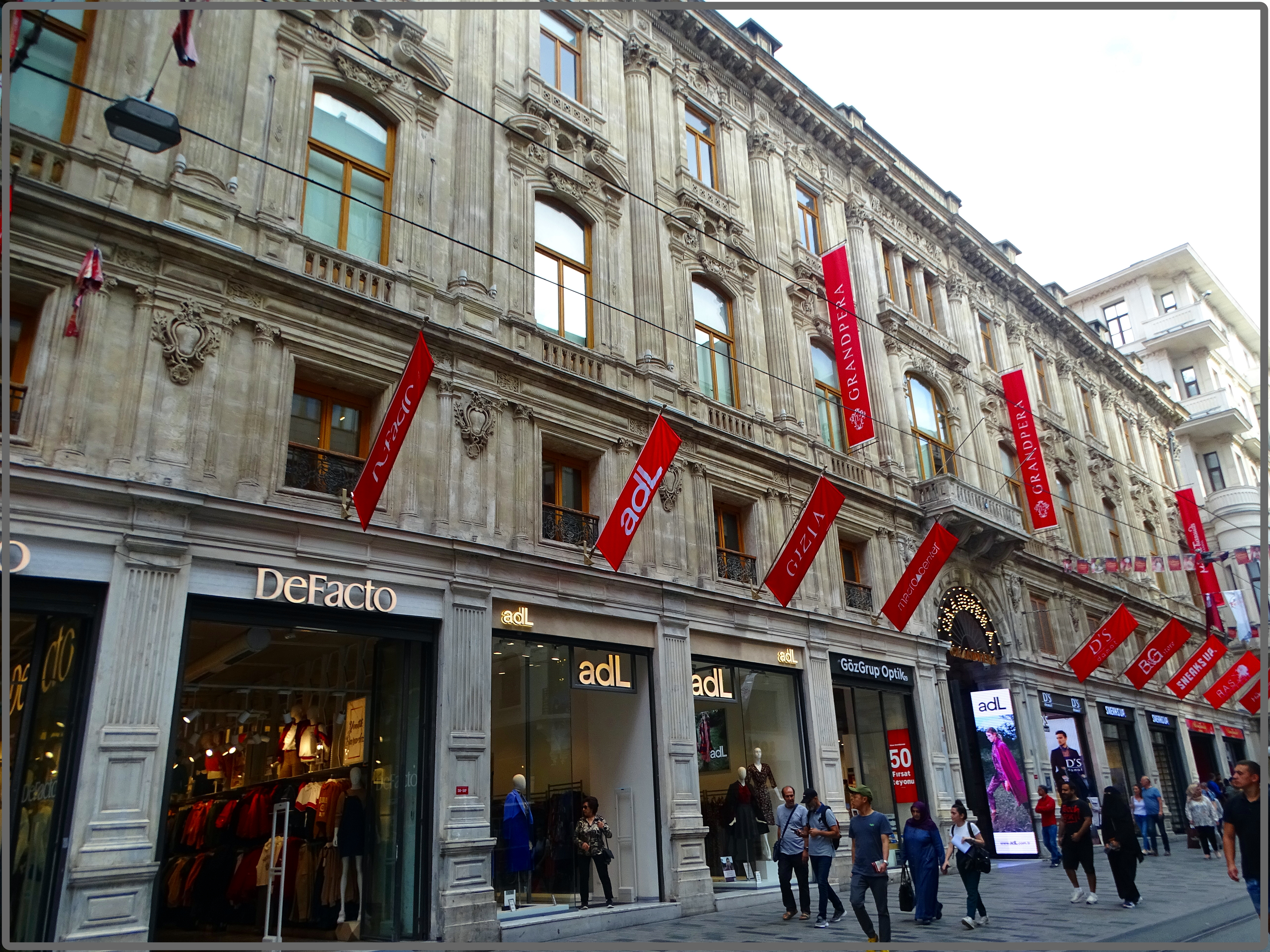
Cercle de l'Orient building, Istanbul, today the Grand Pera complex

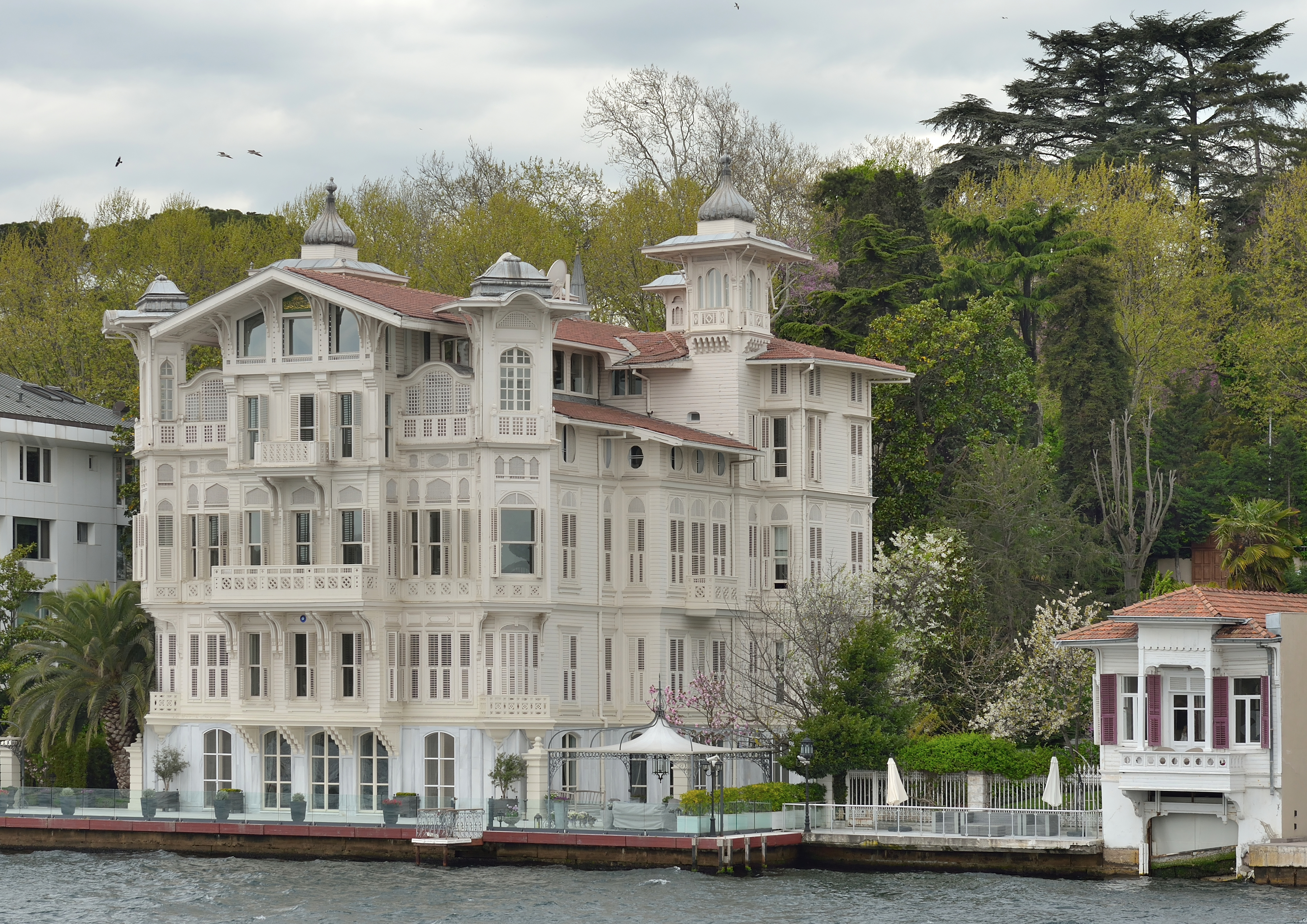
Yalı of Ahmet Afif Pasha in Yeniköy on the European coast of the Bosphorus strait, designed by Alexandre Vallaury.

- Afif Pasha waterfront mansion (Muhayyeş Yalısı), (circa 1910) - Yeniköy, Istanbul
- Café Lebon (from 1940 on Café Marquise - Markiz Pastanesi) (1880) - Beyoğlu, Istanbul
- Décugis house (today Galata Antique Hotel) (1881) - Beyoğlu, Istanbul
- Grand Pera (Cercle de l'Orient building and Emek cinema) (1883) - İstiklal Avenue, Beyoğlu, Istanbul
- Haydarpaşa Breakwater (1902) - Kadıköy, Istanbul
- Hezaren Han (1902) - Karaköy, Istanbul
- Hidayet Mosque (1887) - Eminönü, Istanbul
- Hotel Pera Palace (1881-1891) -Beyoğlu, Istanbul
- Imperial Military School of Medicine (with Raimondo D'Aronco; later Haydarpaşa High School, today Marmara University Faculty of Law) (1893-1902) - Haydarpaşa, Istanbul
- Imperial Ottoman Bank and Ottoman Tobacco Company headquarters (1892) - Karaköy, Istanbul
- Istanbul Archaeology Museum main building (1891-1907) - Sultanahmet, Istanbul
- Ömer Abed Han (1902) - Karaköy, Istanbul
- Osman Reis Mosque (1903-1904) - Sarıyer, Istanbul
- Ottoman Public Debt Administration building (later Istanbul High School) (1897) - Cağaloğlu, Istanbul
- Prinkipo Greek Orthodox Orphanage (1898-1899) - Büyükada, Istanbul
- Union Francaise building (in 2018, temporary home of İstanbul Modern) (1896) - Beyoğlu, Istanbul

== See also ==
- Legion of Honour
- List of Legion of Honour recipients by name (V)
- List of foreign recipients of the Legion of Honour by country
- Legion of Honour Museum
