= Grand Pera =

Shopping center in historic buildings in Istanbul

Emek
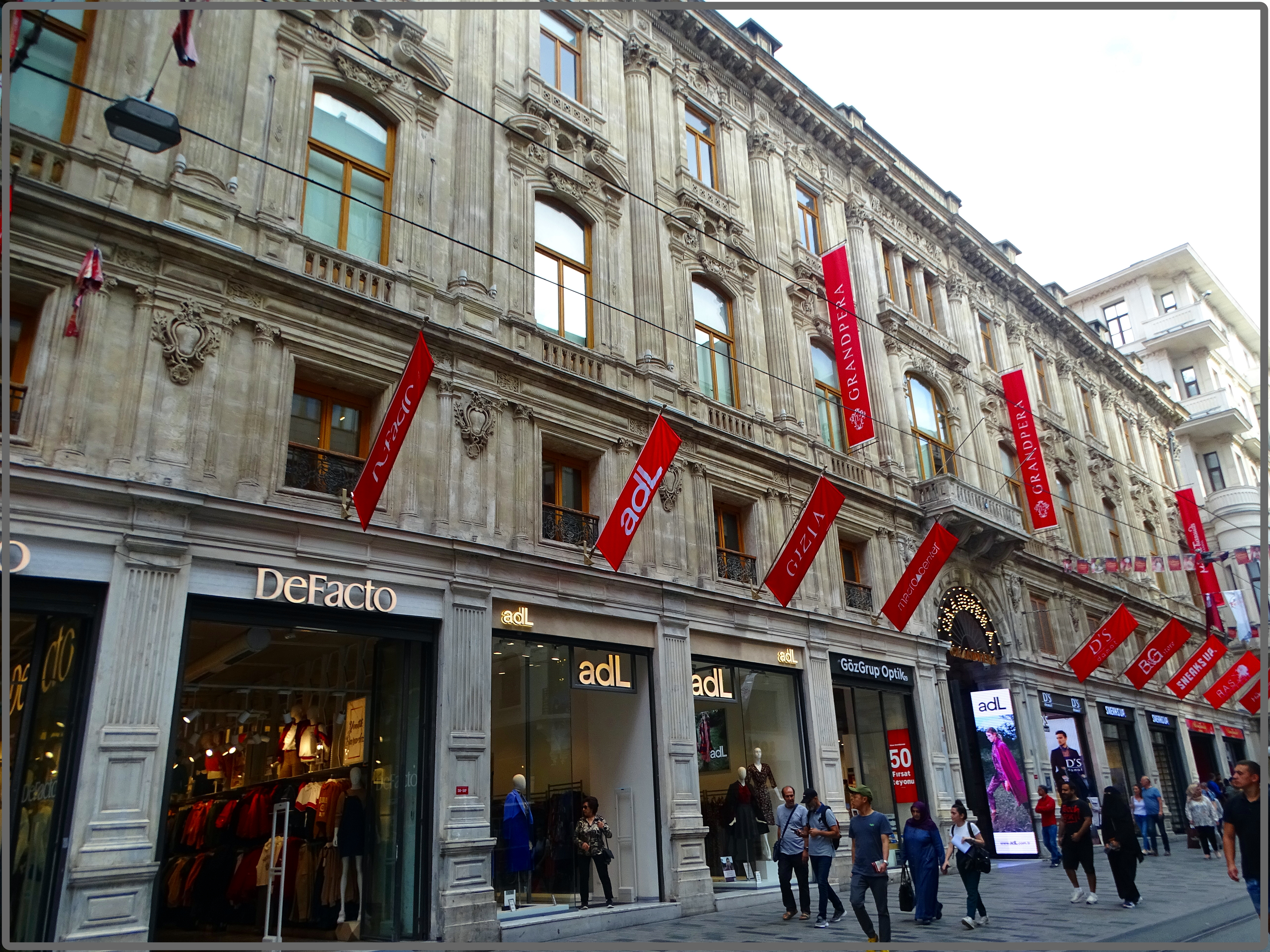
- Address: 56/58 İstiklal Caddesi; Hüseyinağa, Beyoğlu, Istanbul; Turkey
- Type: Cinema

Grand Pera is a shopping center and entertainment complex consisting of two historic buildings, the Emek Movie Theater (Turkish: Emek Sineması), a cinema, and the Cercle de l'Orient building (originally Grand Club), designed by architects Abraham Pasha and Alexandre Vallaury for residential use in 1883. It is located along İstiklal Avenue in the Hüseyinağa neighborhood of Beyoğlu district, Istanbul, Turkey.

== History ==
The movie theater began construction in 1884 under the name "Club des Chasseurs de Constantinople" (Hunters Club of Constantinople), and first opened in 1924 under the name Melek Sineması (Angel Cinema) because of the Art Nouveau style angel figures on the screen. The inner walls and the top of the movie theater have baroque and rococo style figures. The building has since been known under different names such as The Greek Gym of Strangali in 1909, then as "Nouveau Cirque" (New Circus). In 1918 the building was known as "Yeni Tiyatro" (New Theater), and "Emek Cinema" in the 1940s. Latterly the building had been used as a skating palace.

== Destruction ==
In 2010, plans were made to demolish the movie theater as part of a shopping mall construction. Several protests were organized to prevent the demolition from taking place. In 2013, the building was completely demolished.

== Shopping and entertainment center ==
Grand Pera was opened in 2016 after the restoration of the building complex. It is anchored by the cinema, DeFacto clothing store, Zoe Garden, a rooftop bar and nightclub, and HADO, where visitors can play a ball game that is both digital and physical.
