= Hidayat Manaö =

Indonesian officer and jurist

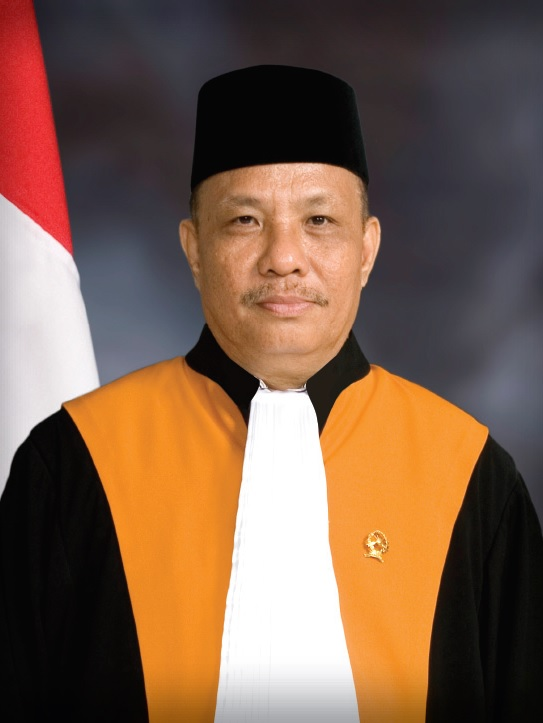

Associate Justice of the Supreme Court of Indonesia
- Incumbent
- Assumed office 7 November 2017

Personal details
- Born: January 1, 1961 (age 65) Bawomataluo, Nias, North Sumatra

Military service
- Allegiance: Indonesia
- Branch/service: Army
- Years of service: 1991—2019
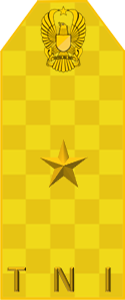
- Rank: Brigadier General
- Unit: Legal

Hidayat Manaö (born 1 January 1961) is an Indonesian military officer from the legal corps who has served as the Associate Justice of the Supreme Court of Indonesia since 7 November 2017.
