= Melih Ulueren =

Turkish diplomat (born 1955)

Turkish Ambassador to Nigeria
- In office 3 July 2018 – 31 March 2021
- Preceded by: Hakan Çakıl
- Succeeded by: Hidayet Bayraktar

Personal details
- Born: 14 November 1955 (age 70) Izmir, Turkey
- Education: Ankara University
- Profession: Diplomat

Melih Ulueren (born 14 November 1955 in İzmir, Turkey) is a Turkish diplomat and ambassador. He was the Turkish ambassador to Nigeria.

He attended and graduated from the Ankara University with a major in the Department of International Relations in 1979. In 1980, Ulueren joined the Ministry of Treasury and the subsequently was assigned to the Ministry of Foreign Affairs, Ankara, in 1982. Between 2008 and 2009, he was elected by the Council of Europe as a member of the Bureau of the European Committee of Migration (CDMG) and conducted the readmission agreement negotiations with the European Union.

In 2010, he was appointed as the Turkish ambassador to Uganda until 2013. In October 2015, during the Turkey United Nations Convention to Combat Desertification Conference he served as the counsel to the Ministry of Foreign Affairs.

He was appointed the Turkish ambassador to Nigeria in July 2018, and was replaced in 2021 with Ambassador Hidayet Bayraktar.
