= Əlinəzərli =

- Municipality
- Location within Azerbaijan
- Coordinates: 39°47′08″N 47°41′51″E
- Country: Azerbaijan
- Rayon: Beylagan

Population
  - Total: 1,588
- Time zone: UTC+4 (AZT)
  - Summer (DST): UTC+5 (AZT)

Əlinəzərli is a village and municipality in the Beylagan Rayon of Azerbaijan. It has a population of 1,588.
