= Hidayet Bayraktar =

Turkish diplomat (born 1962)

Turkish Ambassador to Nigeria
- Incumbent
- Assumed office 16 April 2021
- Preceded by: Melih Ulueren

Personal details
- Born: 25 March 1962 (age 64) Nicosia, Cyprus
- Children: 1
- Education: University of Ankara
- Profession: Diplomat

Hidayet Bayraktar (born 25 March 1962, in Nicosia) is the current ambassador of Turkey to Nigeria.

He holds a degree in International Relations from the Faculty of Political Sciences at Ankara University. Bayraktar began his diplomatic career in 1989, joining the Turkish Ministry of Foreign Affairs as a Candidate Career Diplomat. In December 2020, he was appointed as the Ambassador to Nigeria and officially took office on April 16, 2021, taking over from Ambassador Melih Ulueren. Throughout his career, Bayraktar has held various positions at Turkish embassies around the world.

Year	Position	Country
1992 - 1995	Vice Consul, Turkish Consulate General in Jeddah	Saudi Arabia
1995 - 1997	Second Secretary, Turkish Embassy in Brasília	Brazil
1999 - 2001	First Secretary, Turkish Embassy in Tel Aviv	Israel
2001 - 2003	Counsellor, Turkish Embassy in Ljubljana	Slovenia
2005 - 2009	First Counsellor, Turkish Embassy in Skopje	Macedonia
2013 - 2017	Turkish Ambassador in Tirana	Albania
2021–Present	Turkish Ambassador in Abuja	Nigeria
