= Hidayet Mosque =

19th-century mosque in Eminönü district, Istanbul, Turkey

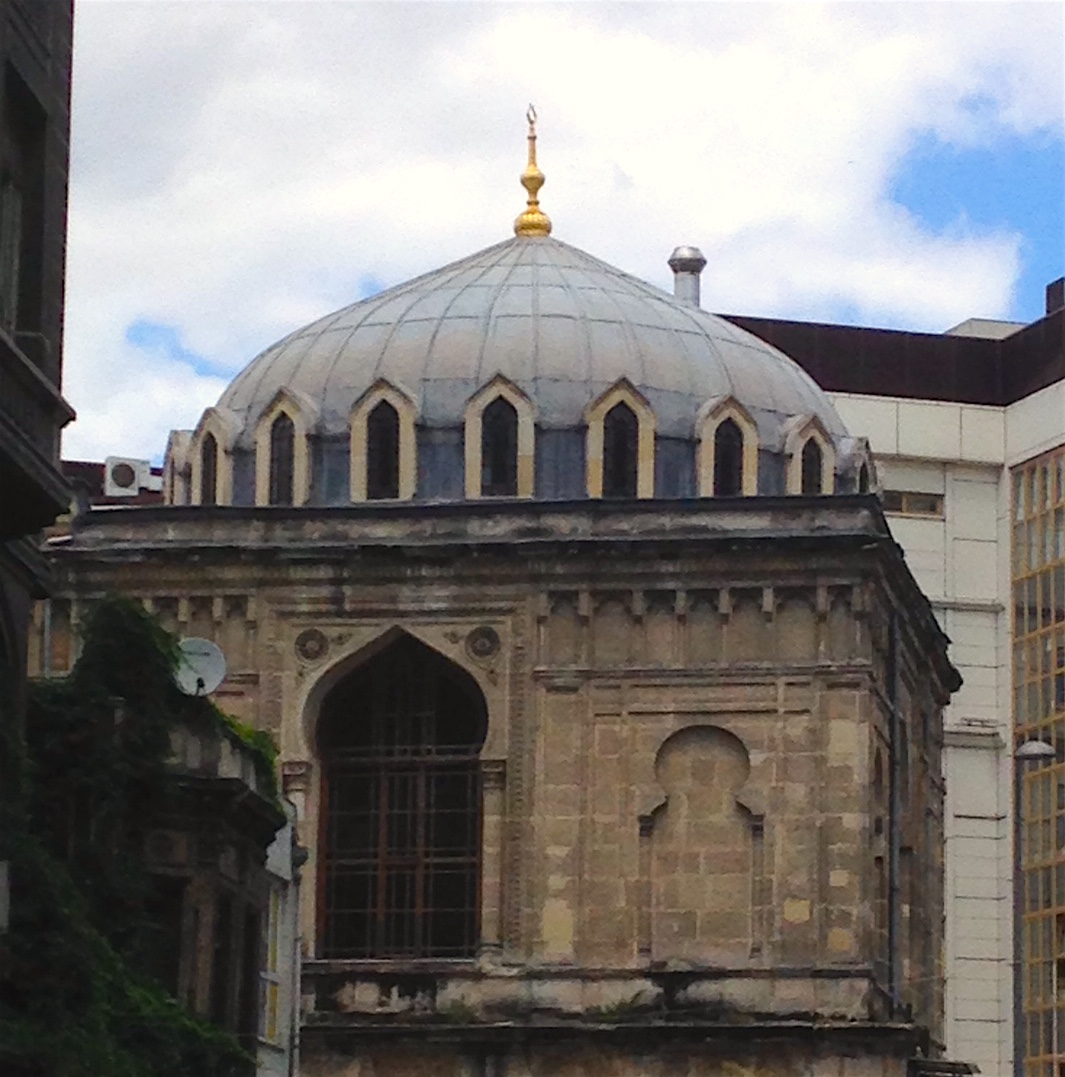
Hidayet Mosque Dome

The Hidayet Mosque (tr:Hidayet Camii), located on Yalı Köşkü Street in Istanbul’s Eminönü district, was built in 1813 (Islamic Calendar 1229) under Mahmud II. Originally of wood construction, it was reconstructed by the French architect Alexander Vallaury in 1887 under the direction of Abdul Hamid II, as described by the inscription on the entrance to the courtyard.

The design of the two-story mosque can be described as Orientalist. There are two large pointed-arch windows on the Eastern and Western sides of the mosque and 21 windows in the dome. Stairs lead to the second floor, where there is a prayer room and a domed sanctuary.

== History ==
Before Hidayet Mosque was built, the small district called tr:Bahçekapı, located between Eminönü and Sirkeci, was a rough district known for murders, prostitution, and general poor conditions. It was given the informal name of tr:Melek Girmez Sokağı ("The street that angels abandoned") by the locals. After the plague of 1812, Mahmud II ordered many Istanbul districts including Bahçekapı demolished, and in order to obscure the history of the area, he had the mosque built with the name Hidayet, a word coming from Arabic meaning "seeking the right path".

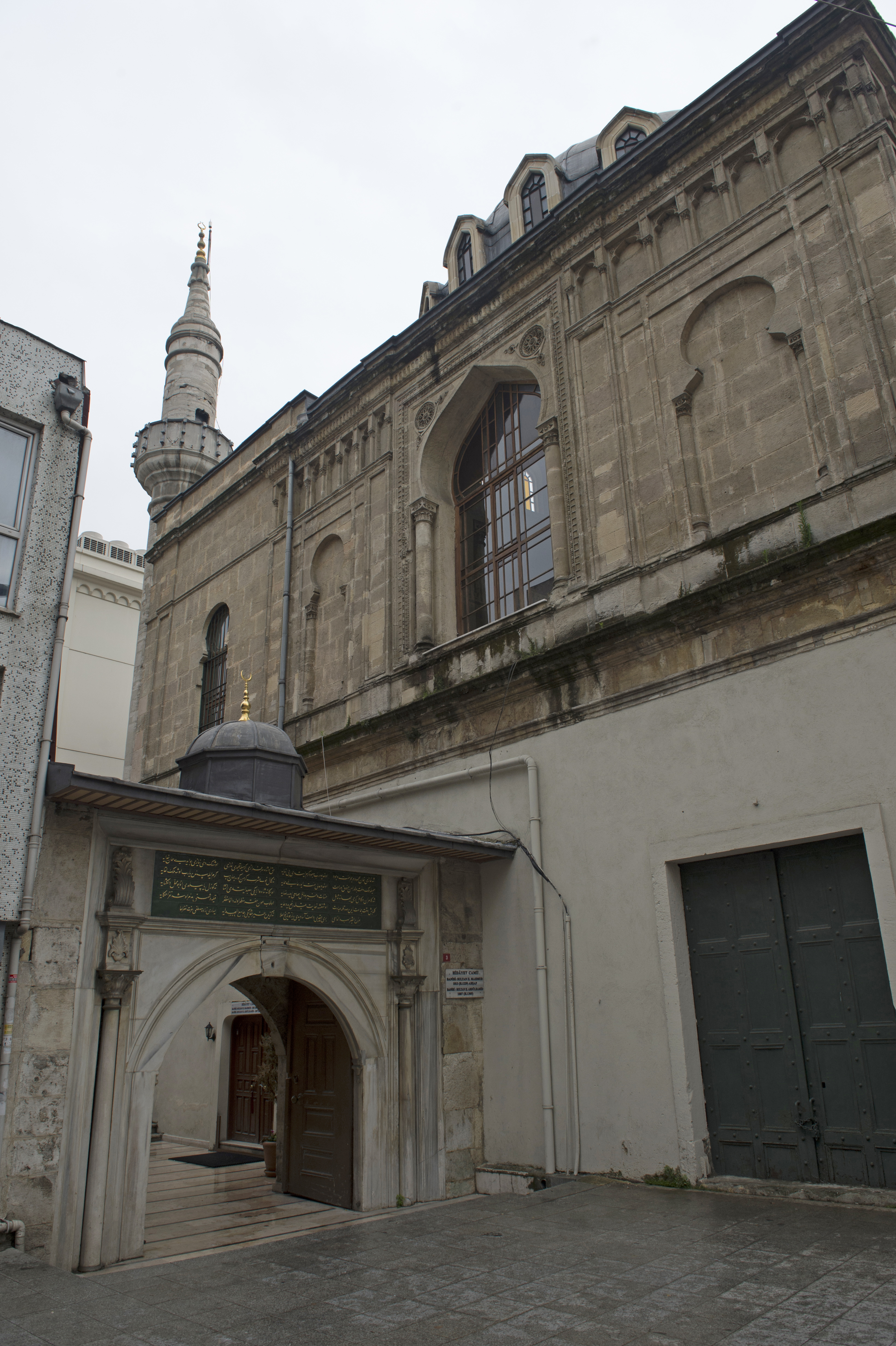
Hidayet Mosque exterior

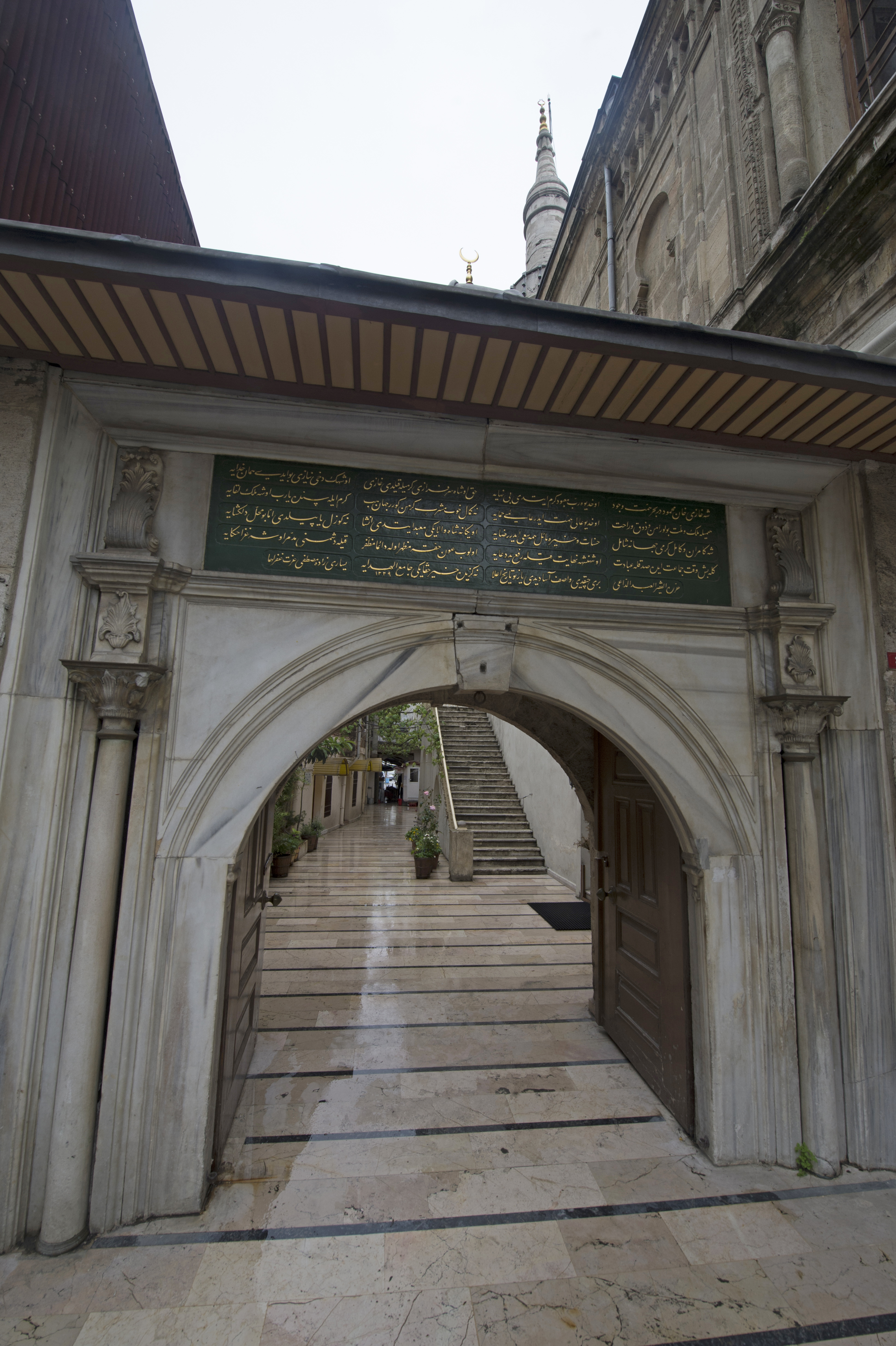
Hidayet Mosque gate

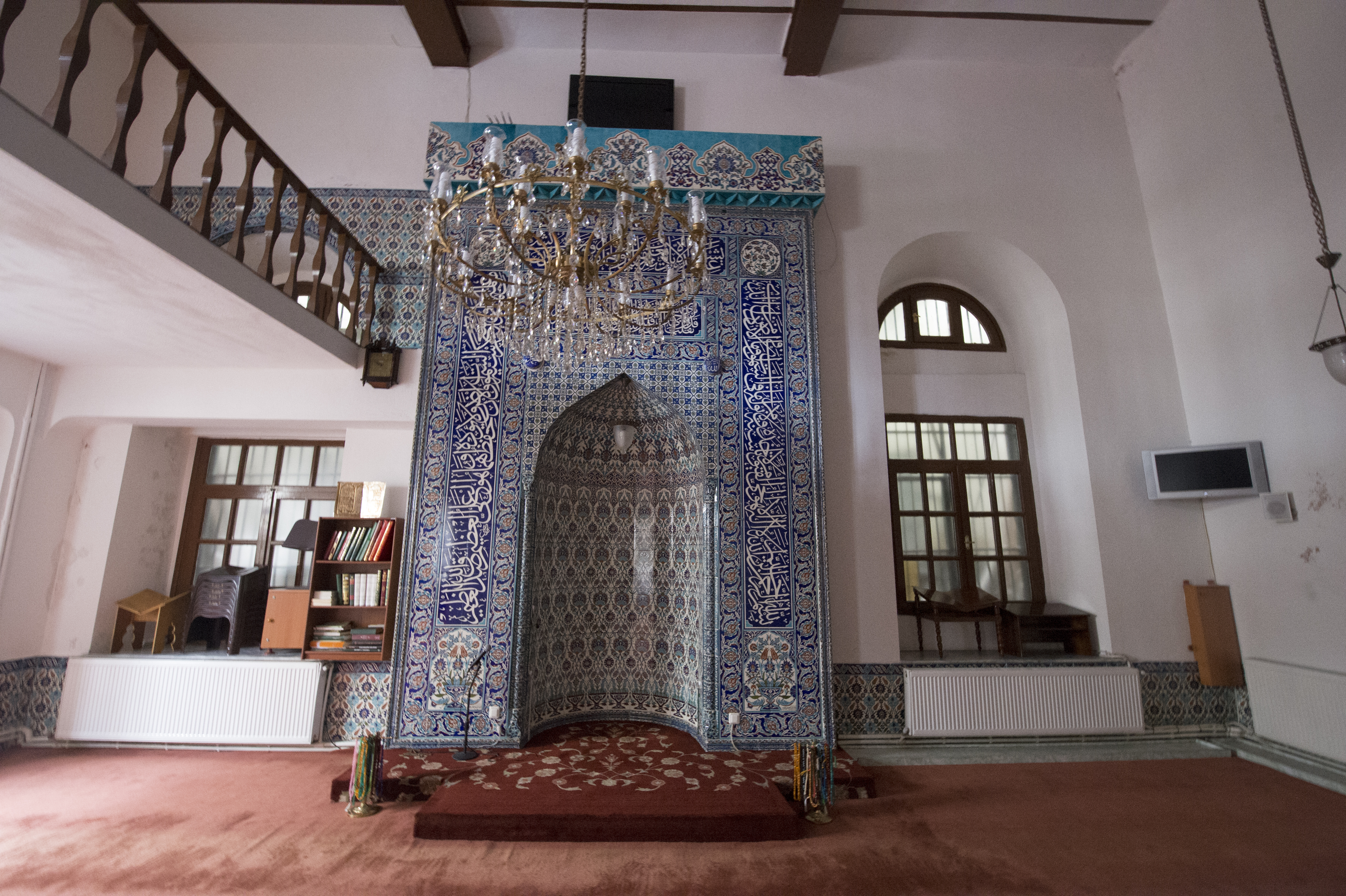
Hidayet Mosque interior lower floor

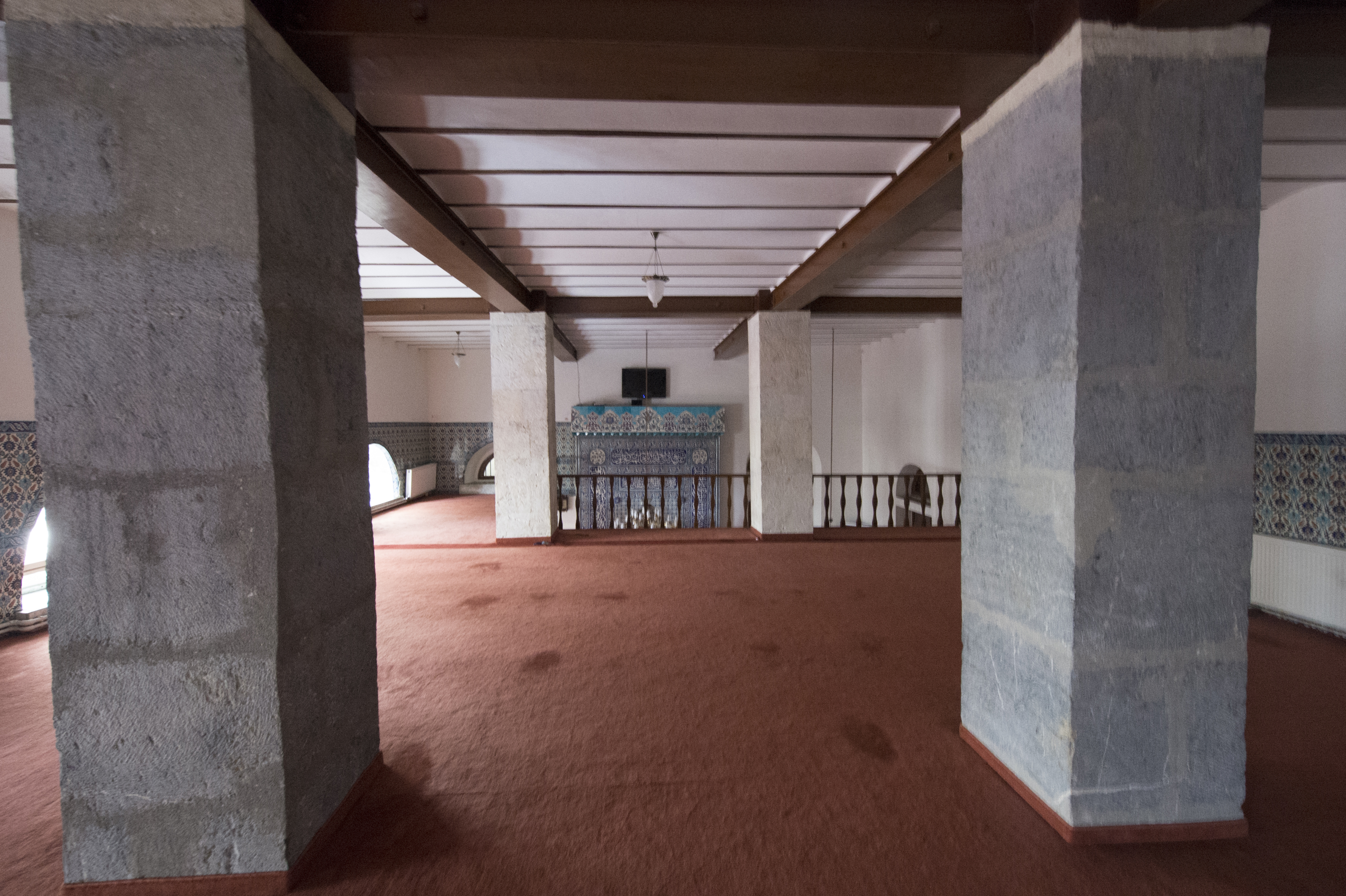
Hidayet Mosque interior upper floor
