= Hidayat al-Mutaʽallemin fi al-Ṭibb =

Hidayat al-Mutaʽallemin fi al-Ṭibb (Arabic: هداية المتعلمين في الطب; lit. A Guide to Medical Learners) is a medical guide written in Persian. The author is Abu Bakr Rabee Ibn Ahmad Al-Akhawyni Bokhari (also spelled Al-Akhawayni Bukhari, ?-983 AD).

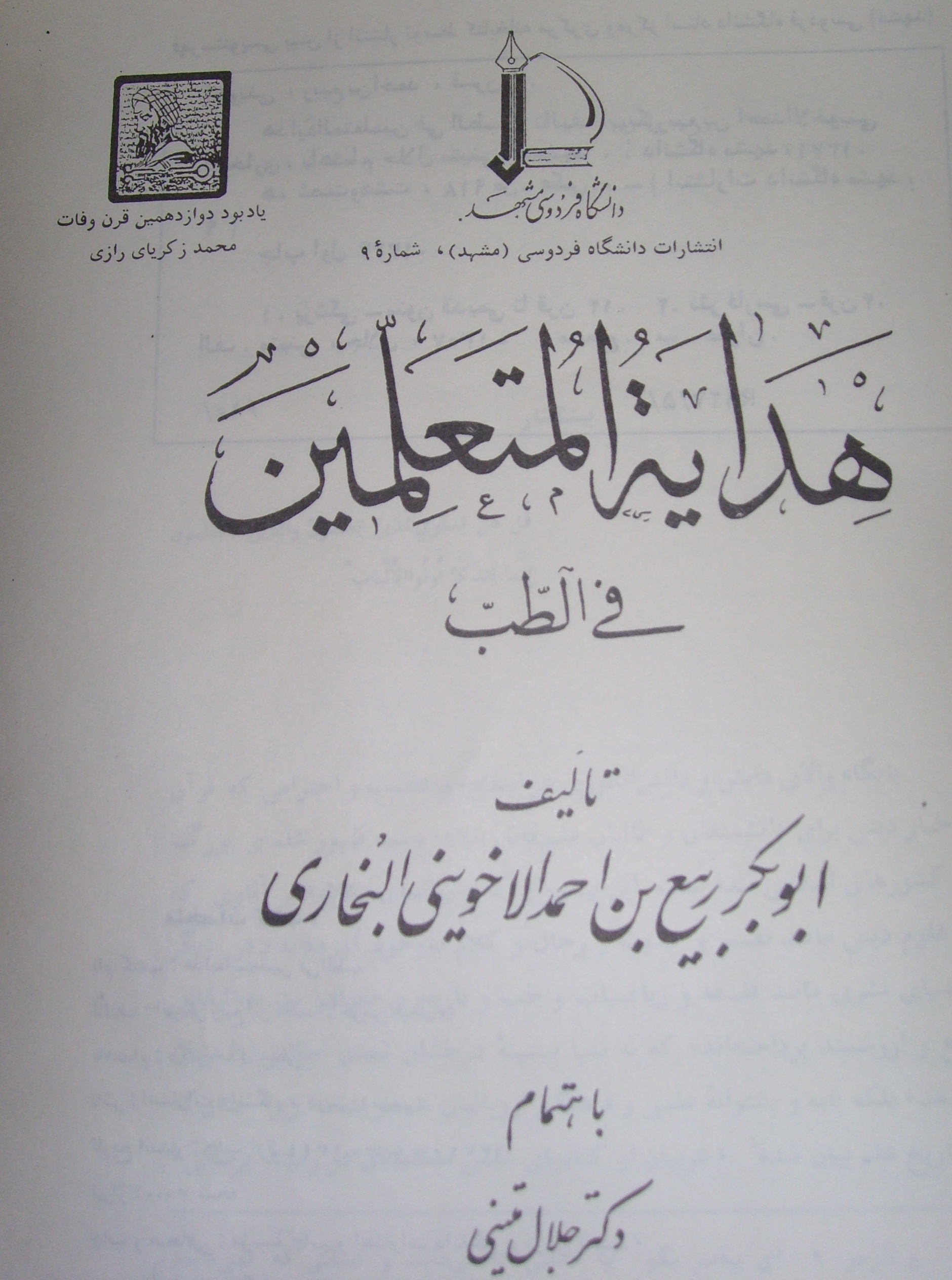
First page of Hidayat al-Mutaʽallemin fi al-Ṭibb

It was one of the first Iranian Islamic medical textbooks. The book contains articles about the elements, temperaments, humors, hygiene, anatomy, physiology, pathology, signs and symptoms of diseases and treatment of many diseases.

Akhawayni Bukhari was the first physician in Iran and Near East that provided a practical classification for mental disorders. The description of Akhawayni from clinical signs and symptoms of patients that suffer from melancholia is attractive in history of psychology.

Several libraries and cultural institutes have copies of the book, including the Bodleian Library in England, the library at Fatih, Istanbul, and the Malek National Library and Museum in Tehran.

== View on melancholia ==
Akhawayni is well known for his treatment of patients with mental disorders and he describes a number of these disorders, such as mania, dementia, conversion disorder and melancholia, in his book. Al-Akhawayni describes melancholia as a chronic illness and relates it to brain, which is one of the main aspects of his view on melancholia. He describes melancholia's initial clinical manifestations as "suffering from an unexplained fear, inability to answer questions or providing false answers, self-laughing and self-crying and speaking meaninglessly, yet with no fever"

He further categorizes melancholia patients into three types:

- first group suffered from significant weight loss in head and neck region
- second group suffered from a significant systemic weight loss and
- third group actually gained a significant increase in appetite

He then described different symptoms and different treatments in each group.

For treatment of this disease, he advised his own treatments in addition to those of his predecessors. These treatments consisted mainly of medicinal herbs and natural fats.
