= Malik Ayaz =

First Ghaznavid governor of Lahore

Ahmed Ayaz
- Malik (Lord)
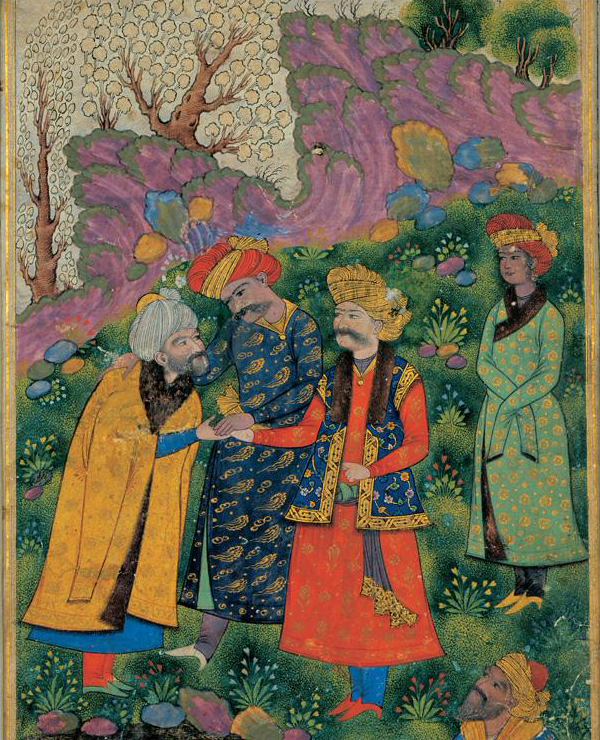
- Ayaz standing behind Sultan Mahmud shaking hands with the Sheykh. The figure to his right is Shah Abbas I who reigned about 600 years later. Tehran Museum of Contemporary Art, Tehran

Ghaznavid Governor of Lahore
- Reign: 1021 – 8 August 1041
- Predecessor: Position established
- Successor: Majdud Ghaznavi
- Born: c. 993; Kingdom of Abkhazia (present day Georgia)
- Died: 8 August 1041; Lahore, Ghaznavid Empire (present day Lahore, Punjab, Pakistan)
- Burial: Tomb of Malik Ahmed Ayaz, Walled City, Lahore
Names
- Malik Ahmed Ayaz bin Aymaq Abu'n Najm
- Father: Aymaq Abu'n Najm
- Religion: Sunni Islam
- Military career
- Allegiance: Ghaznavid Empire
- Branch: Ghaznavid Army
- Rank: Wali, Malik, Ghulam, Mamluk
- Conflicts: Ghaznavid campaigns in India; Siege of Lohkot (1015); Siege of Kannauj (1018); Battle of Lahore (1020)

Sayyid Malik Ahmed Ayāz bin Aymāq Abu'n-Najm (Persian: ملک احمد ایاز بن ایماق ابن نجم; d. 1041), was a slave from Georgia who rose to the rank of officer and general in the army of Sultan Mahmud of Ghazni. He was later awarded the governorship of Lahore thus becoming the first Muslim viceroy of the city. Malik Ayaz's generalship to Mahmud inspired poems and stories, and caused Muslim historians and Sufis to commemorate Malik Ayaz due to his unwavering feudalistic loyalty to Mahmud Ghaznavi. He was found dead in his bed in 1041, with suspicions of foul play being involved.

== Early life and feudal career ==
In 1021, the Sultan Mahmud Ghaznavi raised Ayaz to Lordship, awarding him the throne of Lahore, which the Sultan had taken after a long siege and a fierce battle in which the city was torched and depopulated. As the first Muslim governor of Lahore, he rebuilt and repopulated the city. He also added many important features, such as a masonry fort, which he built in the period of 1037–1040 on the ruins of the previous one, demolished in the fighting, and city gates (as recorded by Munshi Sujan Rae Bhandari, author of the Khulasatut Tawarikh (1596 C.E.). The present Lahore Fort is built in the same location. Under his rule the city became a cultural and academic center, renowned for poetry.

The tomb of Malik Ayaz can still be seen in the Rang Mahal area of Lahore. The tomb and the garden were destroyed by the Sikhs during their rule of Lahore and the tomb was rebuilt after the Partition of India.

== Relationship with Mahmud of Ghazni ==
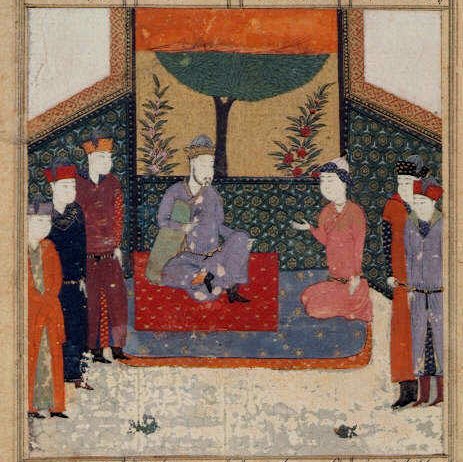
Ayaz kneeling before Sultan Mahmud of Ghazna From Six poems by Farid al-Din 'Attar; Southern Iran, 1472; British Library, London

The nature of the relationship between Mahmud and Ayaz is disputed. Some sources written several centuries later, particularly from Persian poetry, state that the two men were lovers. However, contemporary Ghaznavid authors like Al Biruni, Gardizi, Farrukhi and Bayhaqi make no mention of a romantic relationship between Mahmud and Ayaz. Ayaz served as a commander was either a noble or a close associate of Sultan Mahmud. 12th century Persian poet Nizami Aruzi offered an alternative account of the relationship between Mahmud and Ayaz in his book Chahar Maqala. In this version, they are not lovers, although Mahmud is still in love with Ayaz. Aruzi tells a highly dramatised story in which Mahmud suppresses his feelings due to his piety and refuses to act on them. The story culminates in an incident in which Mahmud orders Ayaz to cut off his hair, in the hope that he will find him less attractive and be better able to resist committing a sin.

== Malik Ayaz in Sufism ==
Amjad Farid Sabri, the slain Qawwal of Pakistan performed a song dedicated to Malik Ayaz, which praises the man for his feudalistic loyalty to Mahmud of Ghazni, the song also mentions Ajmer Sharif Dargah and how it attracts female devotees with the same devotion.

Maulana Khadim Hussain Rizvi states a true story about how Khizr (Peace be upon him) revealed to Mahmud Ghaznavi that Malik Ayaz is a Sayyid. See the entire story here - Mahmood Ghaznavi Aur Hazrat Khizr Ka Waqia #shorts #khadimhussainrizvi

== Bibliography ==
- Ritter, Hellmut (2003). Handbook of Oriental studies: Near and Middle East. Vol. 69. Brill.
