= Al-Khazini =

Persian astronomer and mechanician (1100–1200)

al-Khazini
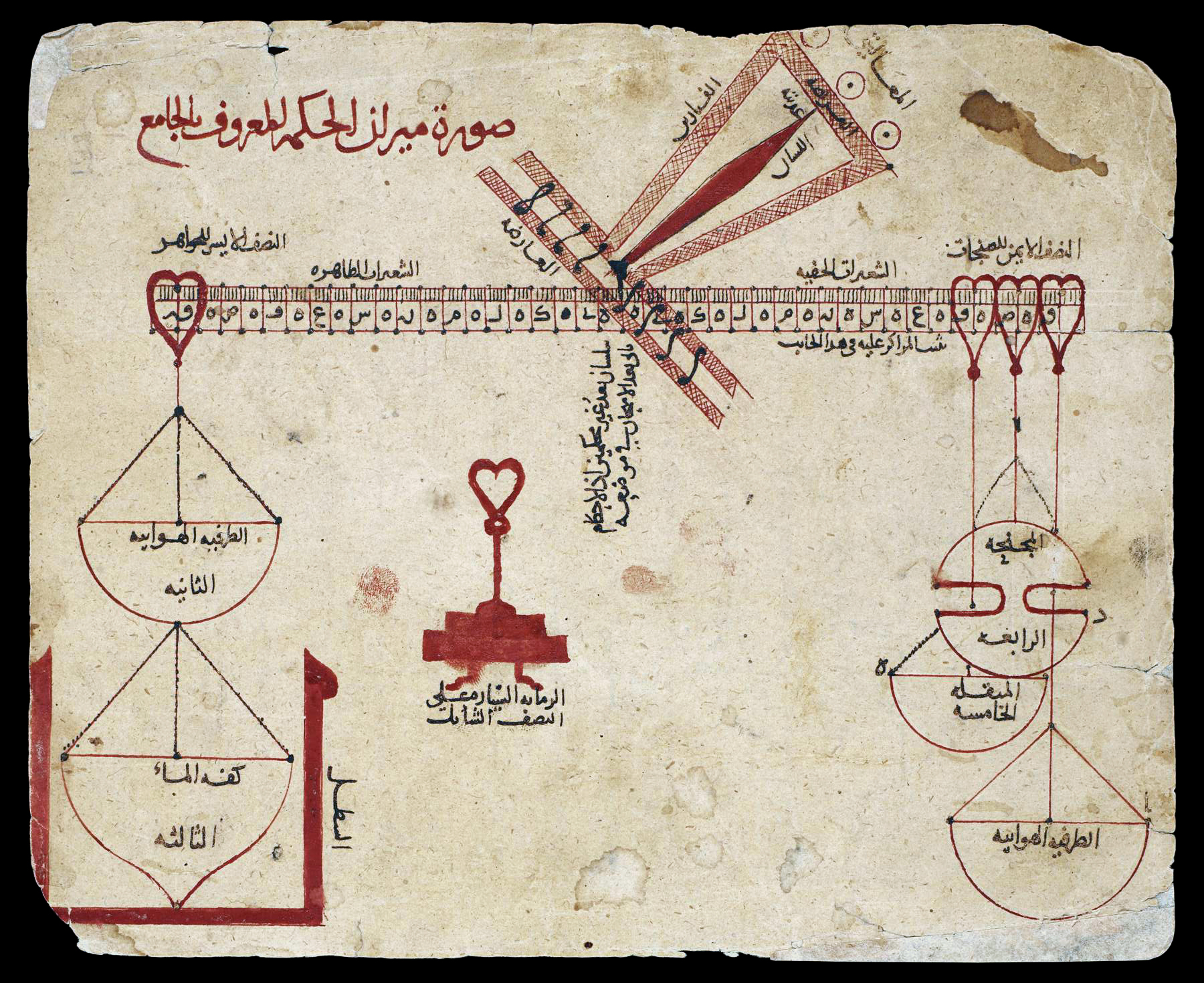
- 13th-century manuscript of al-Khāzinī's Kitab Mīzān al-Hikmah depicting the eponymous balances
- Born: 11th century Seljuk Empire
- Died: 12th century
- Occupation: Scientist
- Era: Islamic Golden Age
- Scientific career
- Fields: Astronomy, mathematics, physics, mechanics, metallurgy

Abū al-Fath Abd al-Rahman Mansūr al-Khāzini or simply al-Khāzini (Persian: أبوالفتح عبدالرحمن منصور الخازنی; flourished 1115–1130) was an Iranian astronomer, mechanician and physicist of Byzantine Greek origin who lived during the Seljuk Empire. His astronomical tables, written under the patronage of Sultan Sanjar (Zīj al-Sanjarī, 1115), are considered to be one of the major works in mathematical astronomy of the medieval period. He is considered to have been one of the greatest scientists of his era, among the greatest makers of scientific instruments of any time, and as "the physicist of all physicists".

Al-Khazini is one of the few Islamic astronomers to be known for doing original observations. He provided the positions of fixed stars, and for oblique ascensions and time-equations for the latitude of Marv in which he was based. He also wrote extensively on various calendrical systems and on the various manipulations of the calendars. He also devised the world's most precise instrument for weighing ordinary objects, determining specific gravities, and even examining the composition of alloys. On the basis of his detailed description, it has been possible to reconstruct his complex mechanism, which he dubbed "The Comprehensive Balance". Modern study affirms his claim to its extraordinary accuracy of 1:60,000.

Al-Khazini was the author of an encyclopedia on scales and water-balances called The Book of the Balance of Wisdom (Kitab Mizan al-Hikmah, 1121), which explored theories of density, specific gravities of metals, precious stones, and liquids, as well as principles of equilibrium. The book is thought to have been "one of the most sophisticated and advanced balances to be designed and manufactured in the medieval Islamic world", and "the most comprehensive work on [weighing] in the Middle Ages, from any cultural area".

== Life ==
Al-Khazini was an emancipated Greek slave in Marv, which was then one of the most important cities of Khorasan. He got his name from his master (Abu‘l Husayn ‘Alī ibn Muhammad al-Khāzin al-Marwazī) who was the treasurer of Marv. The term khāzin was simply the title of the royal treasurer since the early Islamic period. His master made provisions so that al-Khazini could obtain a first-class education. Some believe that al-Khazini was a pupil of Omar Khayyam. While this is not known, he wrote about Khayyam, in particular, he gave a description of the water-balance invented by him (and improved upon by Al-Isfizari). And according to some sources, he collaborated with him on the reformation of the Persian calendar in 1079.

Al-Khazini was known for being a humble man. He refused thousands of Dinar for his works, saying he did not need much to live on because it was only his cat and himself in his household. Al-Khazini was one of only about twenty astronomers of the Islamic era who performed original observations. His works reached Byzantium in the 14th century, in particular, they were studied by George Chrysococces and later by Theodore Meliteniotes.

== Achievements ==
Al Khazini seems to have been a high government official under Sanjar ibn Malikshah and the sultan of the Seljuk Empire. He did most of his work in Merv, where they are known for their libraries. His best-known works are "The Book of the Balance of Wisdom", "Treatise on Astronomical Wisdom", and "The Astronomical Tables for Sanjar".

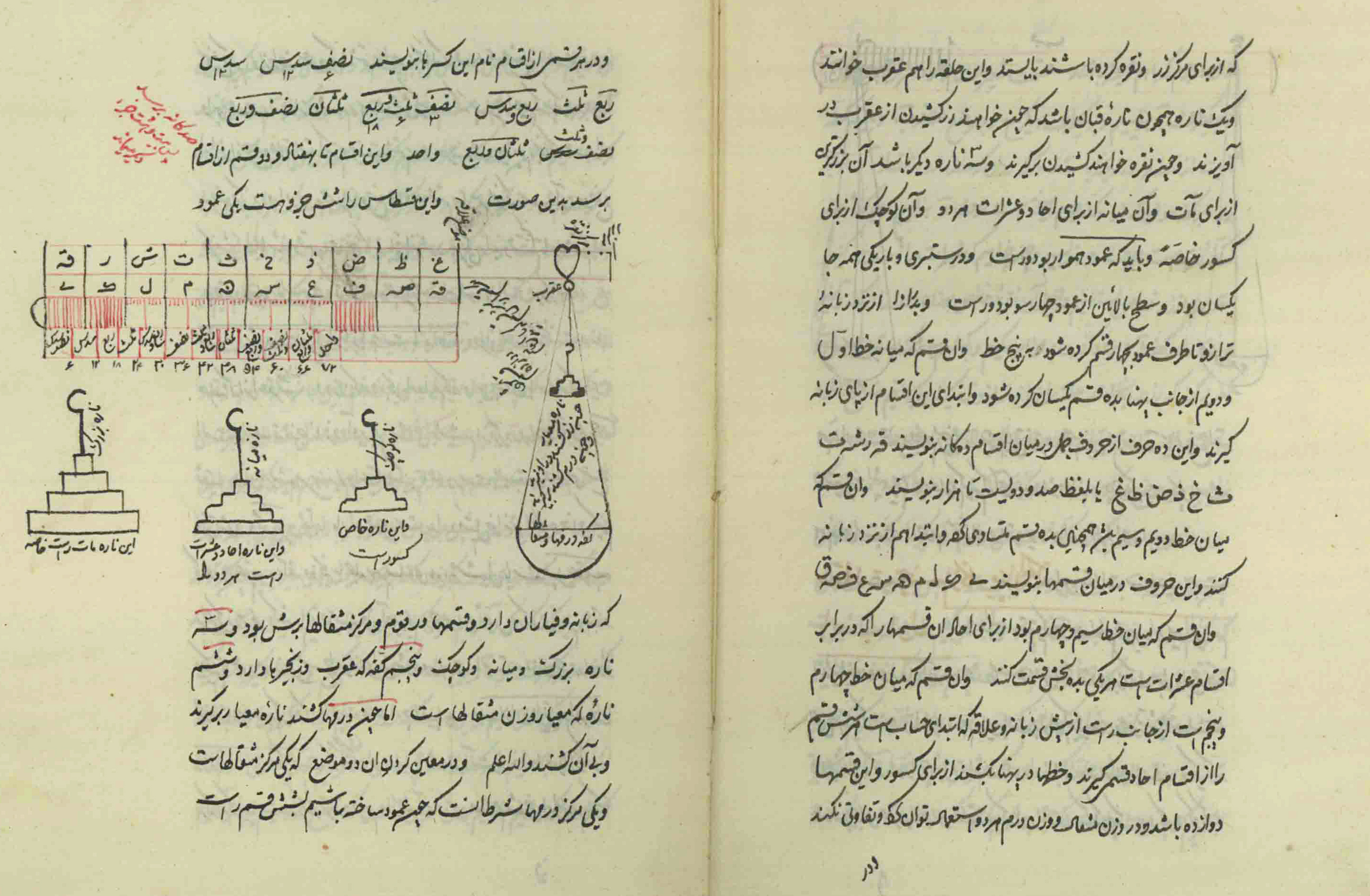
Qajar period illustration from a Persian translation of Mizan al-Hikma

"The Book of the Balance of Wisdom" is an encyclopedia of medieval mechanics and hydrostatics composed of eight books with fifty chapters. It is a study of the hydrostatic balance and the ideas behind statics and hydrostatics, it also covers other unrelated topics. There are four different manuscripts of "The Book of the Balance of Wisdom" that have survived. The balance al-Khazini built for Sanjar's treasury was modeled after the balance al-Isfizari, who was a generation older than al-Khazini, built. Sanjar's treasurer out of fear destroyed al-Asfizari's balance; he was filled with grief when he heard the news. Al-Khazini called his balance "combined balance" to show honor towards al-Isfizari. The meaning of the balance was a "balance of true judgment". The job of this balance was to help the treasury see what metals were precious and which gems were real or fake. In "The Book of the Balance of Wisdom" al-Khazini states many different examples from the Koran ways that his balance fits into religion. When al-Khazini explains the advantages of his balance he says that it "performs the functions of skilled craftsmen", its benefits are theoretical and practical precision.

The "Treatise on Astronomical Wisdom" is a relatively short work. It has seven parts and each part is assigned to a different scientific instrument. The seven instruments include: a triquetrum, a dioptra, a "triangular instrument," a quadrant, devices involving reflection, an astrolabe, and simple tips for viewing things with the naked eye. The treatise describes each instrument and its uses.

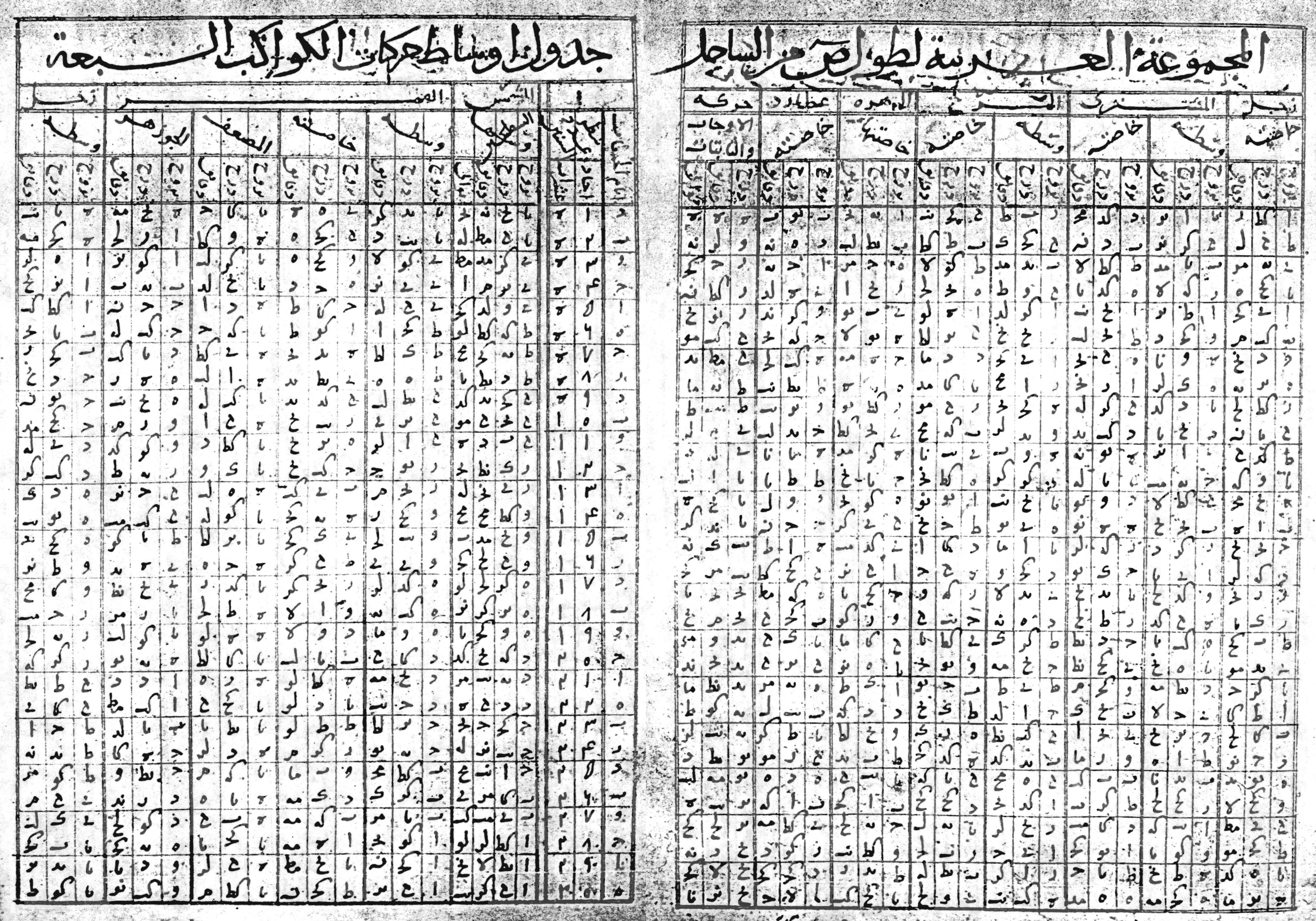
Eponymous astronomical tables from a 19th-century manuscript the Astronomical Tables for Sanjar

"The Astronomical Tables for Sanjar" is said to have been composed for Sultan Sanjar, the ruler of Merv and his balance was made for Sanjar's treasury. The tables in "The Astronomical Tables for Sanjar" are tables of holidays, fasts, etc. The tables are said to have the latitudes and longitudes of forty-three different stars, along with their magnitudes and (astrological) temperaments. It is said that al-Khazini's observations for this work were probably done in Merv in various observatories with high quality instruments.

== Works ==
- Al-Khazini, Book of the Balance of Wisdom (Eng). A Wikimedia pdf of the English translation by Khanikoff and the editors of the Journal of the Oriental Society in 1859 from a single Arabic manuscript which is also reproduced. In 2015, the only available English translation.
- Al-Khazini, Book of the Balance of Wisdom (English). A link to the same at the Internet Archive (see page 1 following).
