= Čahār maqāla =

12th-century Persian text

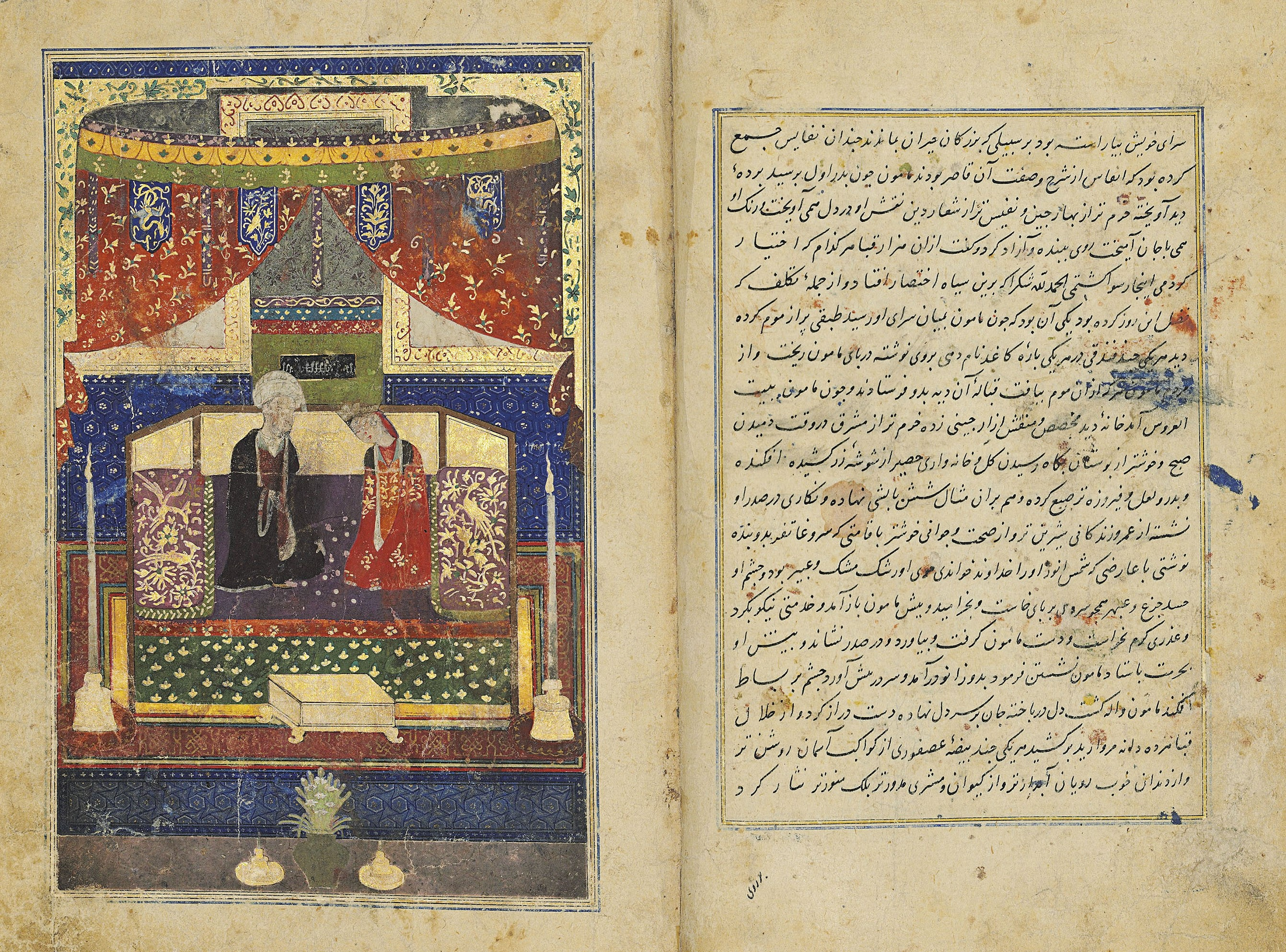
- Folio of a copy of the Chahar Maqala by Nizami Aruzi. Dated 1383, likely from Jalayirid-era Tabriz
- Author: Nizami Aruzi
- Language: Persian
- Subject: Prose

Čahār maqāla (Persian: چهار مقاله, lit. 'Four Discourses') is a prose work written in Persian between 1155 and 1157 by Nizami Aruzi. It comprises four separate discourses (maqalas), each addressing a different topic. The Čahār Maqāla demonstrates Nizami's incredible command of Persian prose and his indepth understanding of philosophical concepts, astronomy, and medicine. Sixty years after its completion, Ibn Isfandiyar incorporated the complete account of Mahmud of Ghazni and Ferdowsi from the Čahār maqāla into his own work, Tārīḵ-e Ṭabarestān.

== Composition ==
Nizami Aruzi wrote the Čahār maqāla(four discourses) from 1155 to 1157. Written in a prose form, in Persian, it consisted of a separate chapter to each of the four key advisors considered essential to a king: the secretary, the poet, the astrologer, and the physician. Each chapter offers practical guidance along with historical stories and examples. It shares thematic elements with an earlier mirror-for-princes work like the Qabus-nama, particularly in its aristocratic and secular focus.

Čahār maqāla was written during the reign of Ala al-Din Husayn, and dedicated to prince Abu’l-Ḥasan Ḥosām-al-Dīn ʿAlī, son of Fakhr al-Din Masud. By the time Nizami composed his work, he had already served the Ghurids for forty-five years. The Čahār Maqāla showcases Nizami’s exceptional command of Persian prose, his deep grasp of philosophical ideas, and his knowledge of astronomy and medicine. It also reflects his scholarly interest in literature and bibliography. Widely read and admired over the centuries, the Čahār maqāla is notable not only for its elegant language—which set a standard for Persian prose in the 12th century—but also for its valuable historical accounts and biographical details of prominent scholars and literary figures. Its influence is evident in later works; for example, Ibn Isfandiyar borrowed the entire narrative about Mahmud of Ghazni and Ferdowsi from the Čahār maqāla and included it in his Tārīḵ-e Ṭabarestān, which was written in 1216–17.

Nizami Aruzi, who frequented Sultan Sanjar's court in Khurasan, states in the Čahār maqāla that the Seljuqs were:

nomads (biyaban-nishin), ignorant of the conduct of affairs and the high achievements of kings, most of these royal customs became obsolete in their time, and many essentials of dominion fell into disuse.

The Chahār Maqāla provides a detailed account of Iranian cultural history during the two centuries leading up to its creation, as well as insights into the literary landscape of Nizami Aruzi's own era. As such, it serves as a crucial primary source not only for understanding literary developments of that time but also for examining the political context of West and Central Asia. By reflecting the dominant cultural values of the ruling class and the social customs of the era, the work offers a valuable lens through which to explore the social, intellectual, and literary currents of the period. Notably, its anecdotes about poets such as Ferdowsi, Omar Khayyam, and Amīr Mu‛izzī, along with scientists like Abū Rayhān Bīrūnī and Muḥammad Zakariyyā Rāzī, are especially informative in this regard.

== Sources ==
- Auer, Blain (2021). In the Mirror of Persian Kings: The Origins of Perso-Islamic Courts and Empires in India. Cambridge University Press. ISBN 9781108936125.
- Dahlén, Ashk P. (2009). "Kingship and Religion in a Mediaeval Fürstenspiegel: The Case of the Chahār Maqāla of Niżāmī ʽArūẓī". Orientalia Suecana. 58: 9–24.
- Durand-Guédy, David (2013). "Ruling from the Outside: A New Perspective on Early Turkish Kingship in Iran". In Mitchell, Lynette; Melville, Charles (eds.). Every Inch a King: Comparative Studies on Kings and Kingship in the Ancient and Medieval Worlds. Brill. pp. 325–342. ISBN 9789004242142.
- Meisami, J. (2008). "Genres of Court Literature". In Bruijn, J.T.P. (ed.). General Introduction to Persian Literature: History of Persian Literature A. Vol. I. I.B. Tauris. pp. 233–269. ISBN 9780857723574.
- Ragan, Mark A. (2023). Kingdoms, Empires, and Domains: The History of High-level Biological Classification. Oxford University Press. ISBN 9780197643037.
- Yūsofī, Ḡolām-Ḥosayn (2015). "ČAHĀR MAQĀLA". Encyclopaedia Iranica.
