= Isfahan Observatory =

The Isfahan Observatory (Persian: رصدخانه اصفهان) or Malikshah Observatory (رصدخانه ملکشاه) was an astronomical observatory constructed during the reign of Sultan Malik Shah I by Omar Khayyam, closing shortly after his death in 1092. It was from the work at the observatory that the Jalali Calendar was adopted. Aside from the work on the calendar, little is known about the purpose of the observatory, as no comprehensive sources from its time period are known to exist about the work performed there.

== History ==
In 1073, Malik Shah invited the astronomer-poet-mathematician Omar Khayyam to oversee an observatory being constructed in Isfahan. The observatory was completed and began operating in 1074. It was scheduled to operate for thirty years, the length of Saturn's revolution around the Sun. Five years after research began, in 1079, Khayyam revealed his corrected calendar and a zīj (a book used for calculating planetary positions), both named after the Sultan. The observatory operated for eighteen years, closing after operating for a short period without financial backing following the death of Malik Shah in 1092.

=== Location ===
Early articles on the Isfahan Observatory theorized its location to be near Nishapur, Rey, or Merv. However, modern scholars believe the location to be in or near Isfahan. At the time of the founding of the observatory, Isfahan was the capital of the Great Seljuk rulers and enjoyed great prosperity and renown as a result of its favorable geographic position and climate.

=== Astronomical Advances ===
Malik Shah's original intent when ordering the construction of the observatory appears to have been to have observations, such as astronomical tables, named after him. The astronomers he had gathered determined this would take too long (about 30 years) and would soon become obsolete, suggesting calendar reform instead. However, some planetary observations were done, published by Khayyam in Zīj-i Malik-Shāhī (Astronomical Handbook with Tables for Malikshah) at the same time as the calendar. The calendar, known as the Maliki or Jamili calendar in honor of Sultan Malik-Shah, was incredibly accurate. It calculated the length of a year with such precision that it had an error rate of one day's error per five thousand years. One notable omission from the work at the Malikshah observatory was astrology. One of Khayyam's students related that Khayyam had never expressed any beliefs in using the stars for prophecy or prediction, so his observatory focused on the physical and mathematical construction of the universe, in a break from the typical astronomical practices of the time.

=== Staff ===
Eight astronomers worked at the observatory. Along with Khayyam, the other known scientists are Abû'l Muẓaffer al Asfizârî, Maymûn ibn Najîb al Wâsitî, Muḥammad ibd Aḥmad al Maʿmûrî Al Bayhaqî, and Abû'l ʿAbbâs al Lawkarî. Some researchers have also suggested Bahrâm and ʿAbd al Raḥmân al Khâzinî were also present, although this is unlikely.

=== Closure ===
The Isfahan Observatory was shut down in 1092, after the death of the sultan Malik-Shah I. Malik-Shah's death was followed by the death of another patron of the observatory, Nizam al-Mulk, who was murdered. Funding was cut off by the Seljuk sultan's wife, who had many disagreements with Mulk and the observatory was closed. Omar Khayyam, who had fallen from favor, stayed on for some time but eventually left his studies there. He would go to continue to work and make contributions in astronomy, mathematics and poetry. Malik-Shah's observatory was the first of many such astronomical observatories in the Islamicate world.

== Historical significance ==
The thirty-year period for research cited by Khayyam and his team is among the first known. This influenced later generations of astronomers, including Nasir al-Din al-Tusi, who referenced the time frame by his predecessors while founding the Maragheh Observatory. The Isfahan Observatory was also the first royally-funded observatory to enjoy a significant period of operation.

== See also ==
- List of astronomical observatories
