= Al-Isfizari =

Islamic mathematician and astronomer from Harran (fl. c. late 11th century)

Abū Ḥātim al-Muẓaffar al-Isfazārī
- المظفر الاسفزاري
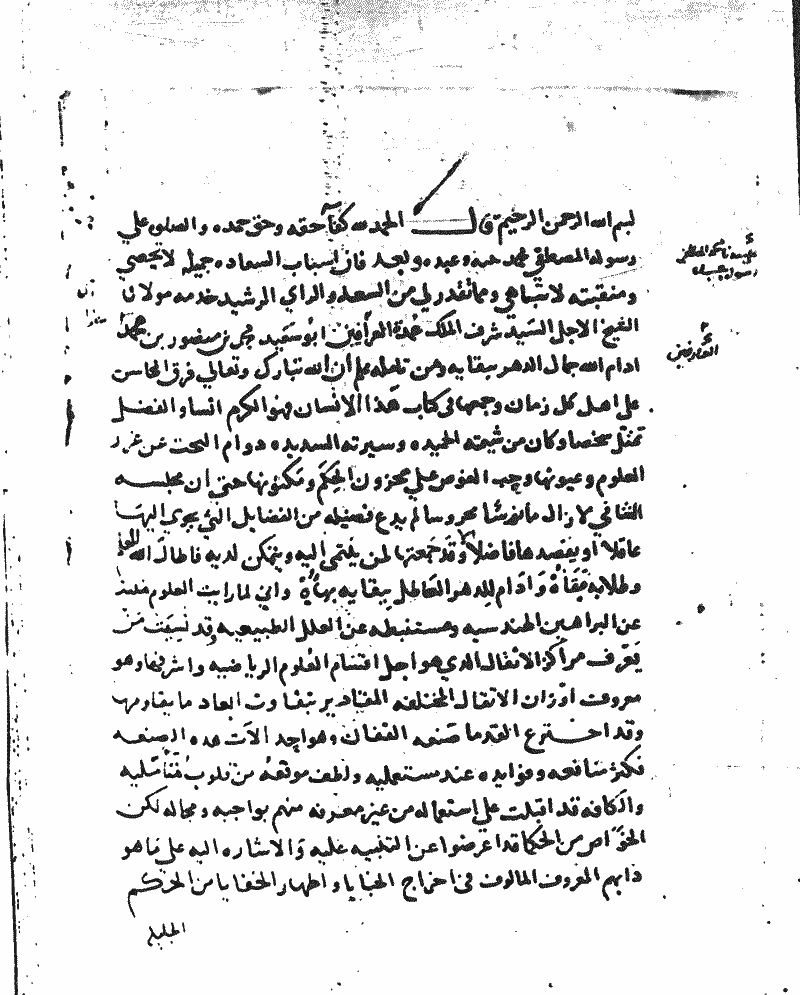
- Manuscript of Irshād dhawī al-cirfān ilā ṣinācat al-qaffān

Academic work
- Era: Islamic Golden Age
- Main interests: Mathematics, astronomy
- Notable works: Irshād dhawī al-cirfān ilā ṣinācat al-qaffān

Abū Ḥātim al-Muẓaffar al-Isfazārī (Persian: ابوحاتم مظفر اسفزاری; fl. late 11th or early 12th century) was an Islamic mathematician, astronomer and engineer from Khurasan. According to the historian and geographer Ibn al-Athir and the polymath Qutb al-Din al-Shirazi, he worked in the Seljuq observatory of Isfahan. The Persian writer Nezami Aruzi met him in Balkh in (in present-day Afghanistan) in 1112 or 1113.

Al-Isfazārī was a contemporary of the Persian polymath Umar al-Khayyam and the Persian astronomer Al-Khazini. Al-Isfazārī's main surviving work, Irshād dhawī al-cirfān ilā ṣinācat al-qaffān (Guiding the Possessors of Learning in the Art of the Steelyard), sets out the theory of the steelyard balance with unequal arms. His other surviving works include a summary of Euclid's Elements, a text on geometrical measurements, and a treatise in Persian on meteorology.

Al-Isfazārī's corpus of mechanics is composed of two sets of texts, which have been published as Matn al-Muẓaffar al-Isfazārī fī cilmay al-aṯqāl wa’l-ḥiyal(Text of Al-Muzaffar Al-Isfazar in the words Al-Taql and Al-Hail) by the Al-Furqan Islamic Heritage Foundation.
