= Omar Khayyam =

Persian polymath and poet (1048–1131)

Hakim Omar Khayyam
- عمر خیّام
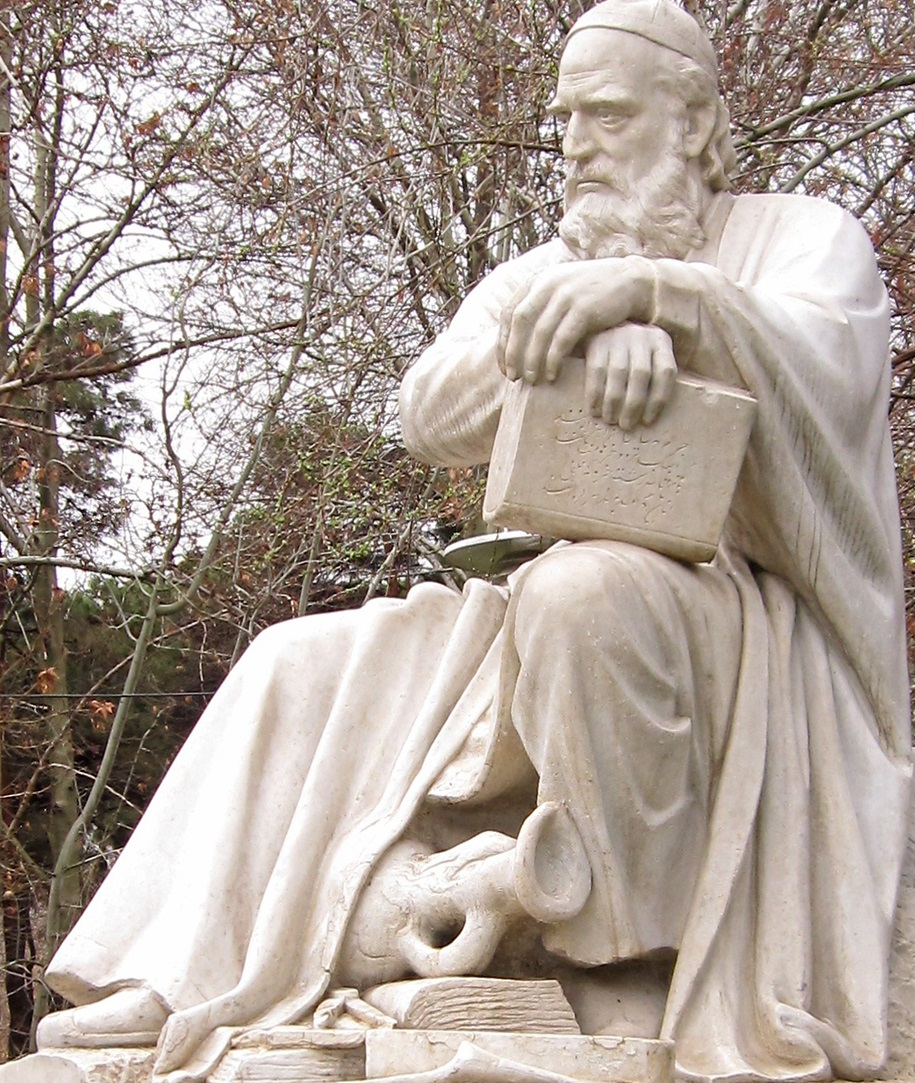
- Statue of Khayyam by Abolhassan Sadighi, at Laleh Park in Tehran
- Born: 18 May 1048; Nishapur, Khorasan, Seljuk Empire
- Died: 4 December 1131 (aged 83); Nishapur, Khorasan, Seljuk Empire

Academic background
- Influences: Avicenna; al-Khwārizmī; Euclid; Apollonius of Perge

Academic work
- Main interests: Mathematics; Astronomy; Persian philosophy; Persian poetry
- Influenced: Tusi; Al-Khazini; Nizami Aruzi of Samarcand; Hafez; Sadegh Hedayat; André Gide; John Wallis; Saccheri; Edward FitzGerald; Maurice Bouchor; Henri Cazalis; Jean Chapelain; Amin Maalouf

Omar Khayyam (Note: Persian: (عمر خیّام); [oˈmæɾ xæjˈjɒːm]; /kaɪˈjɑːm, kaɪˈjæm/) (Note: Full name: Ghiyāth al-Dīn Abū al-Fatḥ ʿUmar ibn Ibrāhīm Nīshābūrī (18 May 1048 – 4 December 1131) (Persian: غیاث‌الدین ابوالفتح عمر بن ابراهیم خیام نیشابورﻯ)) (1048–1131) was a Persian poet and polymath, known for his contributions to mathematics, astronomy, philosophy, and Persian literature. He was born in Nishapur, Iran and lived during the Seljuk era, around the time of the First Crusade.

As a mathematician, Omar Khayyam was the first to provide a general solution for all third-degree polynomials by using the intersection of two conic sections, a method often later attributed to Descartes. Unlike Descartes, Khayyam performed these geometric calculations by selecting a unit length while strictly adhering to the rule of homogeneity. Additionally, in his work On the Division of a Quarter of a Circle, he attempted to derive approximate numerical solutions for cubic equations using trigonometric tables. He also contributed to a deeper understanding of Euclid's parallel axiom. The Saccheri quadrilateral is sometimes called a Khayyam–Saccheri quadrilateral to credit Omar Khayyam, who described it in his 11th-century book Risāla fī šarḥ mā aškala min muṣādarāt kitāb Uqlīdis (Explanations of the difficulties in the postulates of Euclid). As an astronomer, he calculated the duration of the solar year with remarkable precision and accuracy, and designed the Jalali calendar, a solar calendar with a very precise 33-year intercalation cycle (Note: With an error of one day accumulating over 5,000 years, it was more precise than the Gregorian calendar of 1582, which has an error of one day every 3,330 years.) which provided the basis for the Persian calendar that is still in use after nearly a millennium.

There is a tradition of attributing poetry to Omar Khayyam, written in the form of quatrains (rubāʿiyāt رباعیات). This poetry became widely known to the English-reading world in a translation by Edward FitzGerald (Rubaiyat of Omar Khayyam, 1859), which enjoyed great success in the Orientalism of the fin de siècle.

== Life ==
Ghiyāth al-Dīn Abū al-Fatḥ ʿUmar ibn Ibrāhīm Nīshāpūrī was born in Nishapur—a metropolis in Khorasan province of the Seljuk Empire, of Persian stock, in 1048. In medieval Persian texts he is usually simply called Omar Khayyam. (Note: E.g., in Rashid-al-Din Hamadani, or in Munis al-ahrar.) Although open to doubt, it has often been assumed that his forebears followed the trade of tent-making, since Khayyam means 'tent-maker' in Arabic. The historian Bayhaqi, who was personally acquainted with Khayyam, provides the full details of his horoscope: "he was Gemini, the sun and Mercury being in the ascendant[...]". This was used by modern scholars to establish his date of birth as 18 May 1048.

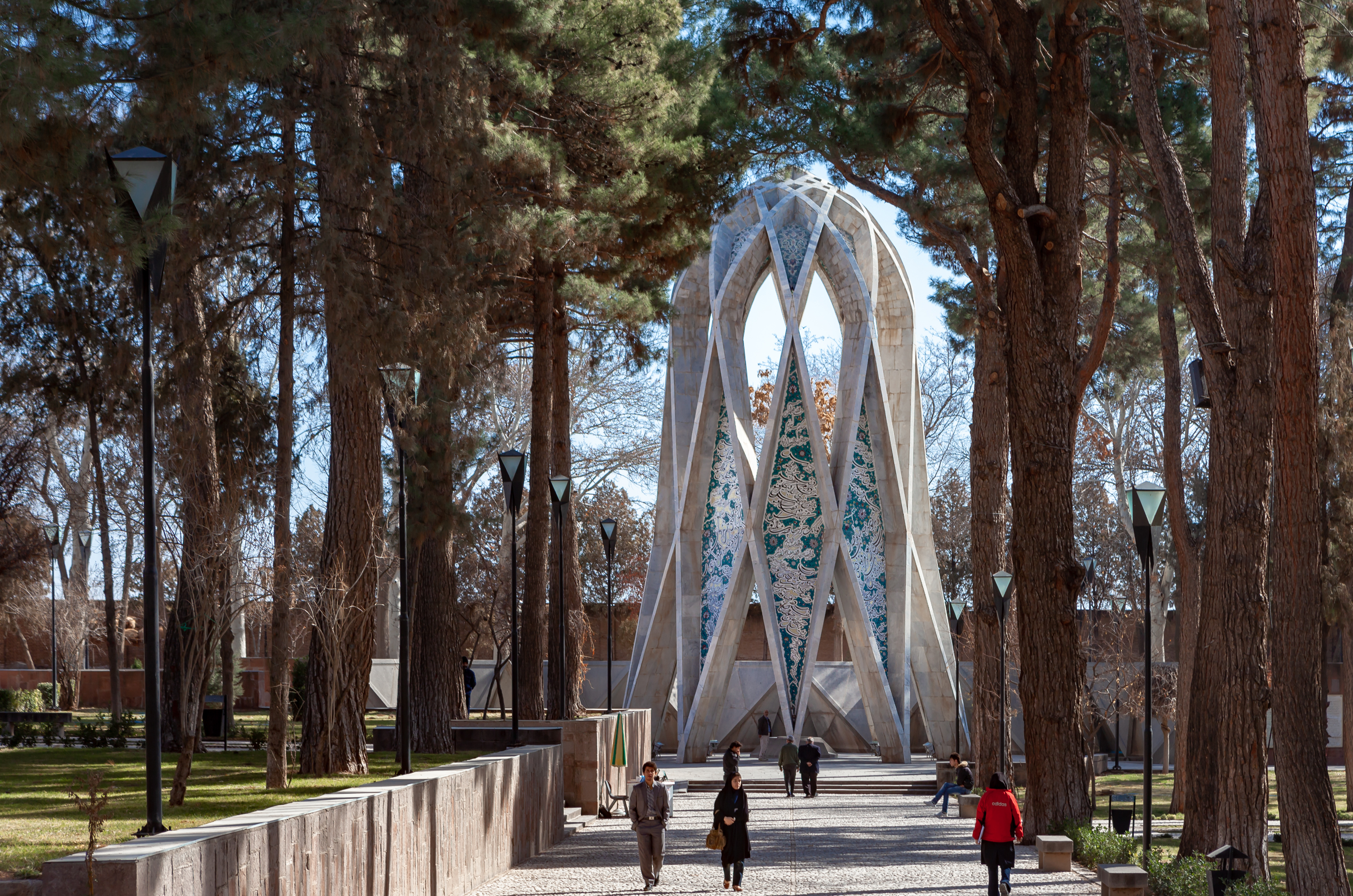
Mausoleum of Omar Khayyam in Nishapur, Iran. Some of his rubáiyáts are used as calligraphic (taliq script) decoration on the exterior body of his mausoleum.

Khayyam's boyhood was spent in Nishapur, a leading metropolis in the Seljuk Empire, which had earlier been a major center of the Zoroastrian religion. His full name, as it appears in Arabic sources, was Abu’l Fath Omar ibn Ibrahim al-Khayyam. (Note: In e.g., al-Qifti, or Bayhaqi.) Having memorized much of the Quran at a young age, Khayyam studied religious sciences, Arabic grammar, and literature under Mawlana Qadi Muhammad. He later transferred to the tutelage of Khawjah Abu’l-Hasan al-Anbari to pursue mathematics, astronomy, and cosmological doctrines, including Ptolemy's major work, the Almagest. His gifts were recognized by his early tutors, who sent him to study under Imam Muwaffaq Nishaburi, the greatest teacher of the Khorasan region, who tutored the children of the highest nobility, and Khayyam developed a firm friendship with him through the years. Khayyam might have met and studied with Bahmanyar, a disciple of Avicenna. After studying science, philosophy, mathematics and astronomy at Nishapur, about the year 1068 he traveled to the province of Bukhara, where he frequented the renowned library of the Ark. In about 1070 he moved to Samarkand, where he started to compose his famous Treatise on Algebra under the patronage of Abu Tahir Abd al-Rahman ibn ʿAlaq, the governor and chief judge of the city. Khayyam was kindly received by the Karakhanid ruler Shams al-Mulk Nasr, who according to Bayhaqi, would "show him the greatest honour, so much so that he would seat [Khayyam] beside him on his throne".

In 1073–4 peace was concluded with Sultan Malik-Shah I, who had made incursions into Karakhanid dominions. Khayyam entered the service of Malik-Shah in 1074 when he was invited by the Grand Vizier Nizam al-Mulk to meet Malik-Shah in the city of Marv. Khayyam was subsequently commissioned to set up an observatory in Isfahan and lead a group of scientists in carrying out precise astronomical observations aimed at the revision of the Persian calendar. The undertaking probably began with the opening of the observatory in 1074 and ended in 1079, when Omar Khayyam and his colleagues concluded their measurements of the length of the year, reporting it as 365.24219858156 days. Given that the length of the year is changing in the sixth decimal place over a person's lifetime, this is outstandingly accurate. For comparison, the length of the year at the end of the 19th century was 365.242196 days, while today it is 365.242190 days.

After the death of Malik-Shah and his vizier (murdered, it is thought, by the Ismaili order of Assassins), Khayyam fell from favor at court, and as a result, he soon set out on his pilgrimage to Mecca. A possible ulterior motive for his pilgrimage reported by Al-Qifti, was a public demonstration of his faith with a view to allaying suspicions of skepticism and confuting the allegations of unorthodoxy (including possible sympathy or adherence to Zoroastrianism) levelled at him by a hostile clergy. He was then invited by the new Sultan Sanjar to Marv, possibly to work as a court astrologer. He was later allowed to return to Nishapur owing to his declining health. Upon his return, he seems to have lived the life of a recluse.

Omar Khayyam died at the age of 83 in his hometown of Nishapur on 4 December 1131, and he is buried in what is now the Mausoleum of Omar Khayyam. One of his disciples Nizami Aruzi relates the story that sometime during 1112–3 Khayyam was in Balkh in the company of Isfizari (one of the scientists who had collaborated with him on the Jalali calendar) when he made a prophecy that "my tomb shall be in a spot where the north wind may scatter roses over it". Four years after his death, Aruzi located his tomb in a cemetery in a then large and well-known quarter of Nishapur on the road to Marv. As it had been foreseen by Khayyam, Aruzi found the tomb situated at the foot of a garden-wall over which pear trees and apricot trees had thrust their heads and dropped their flowers so that his tombstone was hidden beneath them.

== Mathematics ==
Khayyam was famous during his life as a mathematician. His surviving mathematical works include

- (i) Commentary on the Difficulties Concerning the Postulates of Euclid's Elements (Risāla fī Sharḥ mā Ashkal min Muṣādarāt Kitāb Uqlīdis), completed in December 1077,
- (ii) Treatise On the Division of a Quadrant of a Circle (Risālah fī Qismah Rub‘ al-Dā’irah), undated but completed prior to the Treatise on Algebra, and
- (iii) Treatise on Algebra (Risālah fi al-Jabr wa'l-Muqābala), most likely completed in 1079.

He furthermore wrote a treatise on the binomial theorem and extracting the n^{th} root of natural numbers, which has been lost.

=== Theory of parallels ===
Part of Khayyam's Commentary on the Difficulties Concerning the Postulates of Euclid's Elements deals with the parallel axiom. The treatise of Khayyam can be considered the first treatment of the axiom not based on petitio principii, but on a more intuitive postulate. Khayyam refutes the previous attempts by other mathematicians to prove the proposition, mainly on grounds that each of them had postulated something that was by no means easier to admit than the Fifth Postulate itself. Drawing upon Aristotle's views, he rejects the usage of movement in geometry and therefore dismisses the different attempt by Ibn al-Haytham. (Note: Katz (1998), p. 270. Excerpt: In some sense, his treatment was better than Ibn al-Haytham's because he explicitly formulated a new postulate to replace Euclid's rather than have the latter hidden in a new definition.) Unsatisfied with the failure of mathematicians to prove Euclid's statement from his other postulates, Khayyam tried to connect the axiom with the Fourth Postulate, which states that all right angles are equal to one another.

Khayyam was the first to consider the three distinct cases of acute, obtuse, and right angle for the summit angles of a Khayyam-Saccheri quadrilateral. After proving a number of theorems about them, he showed that Postulate V follows from the right angle hypothesis, and refuted the obtuse and acute cases as self-contradictory. His elaborate attempt to prove the parallel postulate was significant for the further development of geometry, as it clearly shows the possibility of non-Euclidean geometries. The hypotheses of acute, obtuse, and right angles are now known to lead respectively to the non-Euclidean hyperbolic geometry of Gauss-Bolyai-Lobachevsky, to that of elliptic geometry, and to Euclidean geometry.

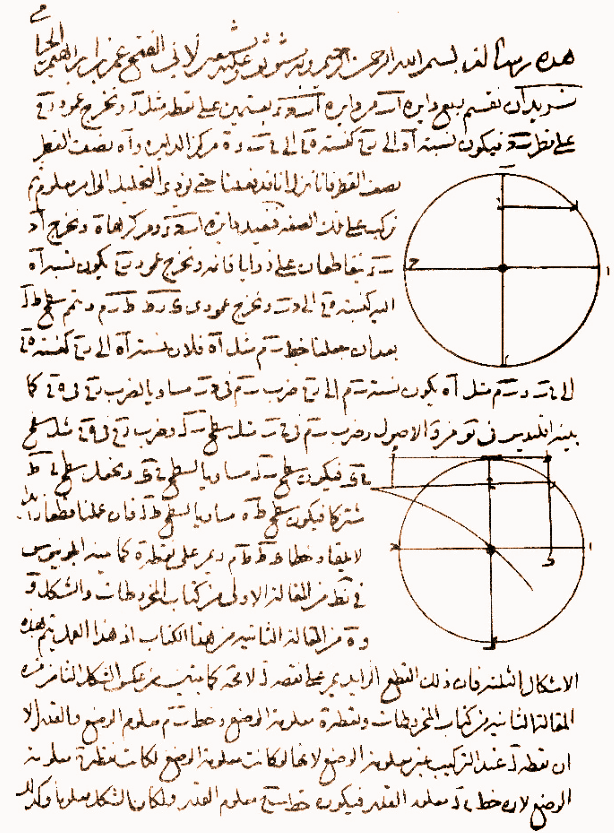
"Cubic equation and intersection of conic sections" the first page of a two-chaptered manuscript kept in Tehran University.

Tusi's commentaries on Khayyam's treatment of parallels made their way to Europe. John Wallis, professor of geometry at Oxford, translated Tusi's commentary into Latin. Jesuit geometer Girolamo Saccheri, whose work (euclides ab omni naevo vindicatus, 1733) is generally considered the first step in the eventual development of non-Euclidean geometry, was familiar with the work of Wallis. The American historian of mathematics David Eugene Smith mentions that Saccheri "used the same lemma as the one of Tusi, even lettering the figure in precisely the same way and using the lemma for the same purpose". He further says that "Tusi distinctly states that it is due to Omar Khayyam, and from the text, it seems clear that the latter was his inspirer."

==== Real number concept ====
This treatise on Euclid contains another contribution dealing with the theory of proportions and with the compounding of ratios. Khayyam discusses the relationship between the concept of ratio and the concept of number and explicitly raises various theoretical difficulties. In particular, he contributes to the theoretical study of the concept of irrational number. Displeased with Euclid's definition of equal ratios, he redefined the concept of a number by the use of a continued fraction as the means of expressing a ratio. Youschkevitch and Rosenfeld argue that "by placing irrational quantities and numbers on the same operational scale, [Khayyam] began a true revolution in the doctrine of number." Likewise, it was noted by D. J. Struik that Omar was "on the road to that extension of the number concept which leads to the notion of the real number."

=== Geometric algebra ===
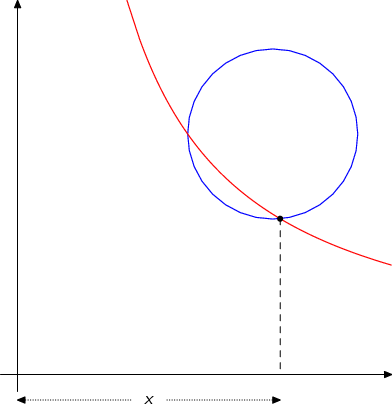
Omar Khayyam's construction of a solution to the cubic x^{3} + 2x = 2x^{2} + 2. The intersection point produced by the circle and the hyperbola determine the desired segment.

Rashed and Vahabzadeh (2000) have argued that because of his thoroughgoing geometrical approach to algebraic equations, Khayyam can be considered the precursor of Descartes in the invention of analytic geometry. In the Treatise on the Division of a Quadrant of a Circle Khayyam applied algebra to geometry. In this work, he devoted himself mainly to investigating whether it is possible to divide a circular quadrant into two parts such that the line segments projected from the dividing point to the perpendicular diameters of the circle form a specific ratio. His solution, in turn, employed several curve constructions that led to equations containing cubic and quadratic terms.

==== Solution of cubic equations ====
Khayyam seems to have been the first to conceive a general theory of cubic equations, (Note: O'Connor & Robertson (July 1999): However, Khayyam himself seems to have been the first to conceive a general theory of cubic equations.) and the first to geometrically solve every type of cubic equation, so far as positive roots are concerned. The Treatise on Algebra contains his work on cubic equations. It is divided into three parts: (i) equations which can be solved with compass and straight edge, (ii) equations which can be solved by means of conic sections, and (iii) equations which involve the inverse of the unknown.

Khayyam produced an exhaustive list of all possible equations involving lines, squares, and cubes. He considered three binomial equations, nine trinomial equations, and seven tetranomial equations. For the first and second degree polynomials, he provided numerical solutions by geometric construction. He concluded that there are fourteen different types of cubics that cannot be reduced to an equation of a lesser degree. For these he could not accomplish the construction of his unknown segment with compass and straight edge. He proceeded to present geometric solutions to all types of cubic equations using the properties of conic sections. The prerequisite lemmas for Khayyam's geometrical proof include Euclid VI, Prop 13, and Apollonius II, Prop 12. The positive root of a cubic equation was determined as the abscissa of a point of intersection of two conics, for instance, the intersection of two parabolas, or the intersection of a parabola and a circle, etc. However, he acknowledged that the arithmetic problem of these cubics was still unsolved, adding that "possibly someone else will come to know it after us". This task remained open until the sixteenth century, where an algebraic solution of the cubic equation was found in its generality by Cardano, Del Ferro, and Tartaglia in Renaissance Italy.

Whoever thinks algebra is a trick in obtaining unknowns has thought it in vain. No attention should be paid to the fact that algebra and geometry are different in appearance. Algebras are geometric facts which are proved by propositions five and six of Book two of Elements.

— Omar Khayyam

In effect, Khayyam's work is an effort to unify algebra and geometry. This particular geometric solution of cubic equations was further investigated by M. Hachtroudi and extended to solving fourth-degree equations. Although similar methods had appeared sporadically since Menaechmus, and further developed by the 10th-century mathematician Abu al-Jud, Khayyam's work can be considered the first systematic study and the first exact method of solving cubic equations. The mathematician Woepcke (1851) who offered translations of Khayyam's algebra into French praised him for his "power of generalization and his rigorously systematic procedure."

=== Binomial theorem and extraction of roots ===
From the Indians one has methods for obtaining square and cube roots, methods based on knowledge of individual cases – namely the knowledge of the squares of the nine digits 1^{2}, 2^{2}, 3^{2} (etc.) and their respective products, i.e. 2 × 3 etc. We have written a treatise on the proof of the validity of those methods and that they satisfy the conditions. In addition we have increased their types, namely in the form of the determination of the fourth, fifth, sixth roots up to any desired degree. No one preceded us in this and those proofs are purely arithmetic, founded on the arithmetic of The Elements.

— Omar Khayyam, Treatise on Algebra

In his algebraic treatise, Khayyam alludes to a book he had written on the extraction of the $n$th root of natural numbers using a law he had discovered which did not depend on geometric figures. This book was most likely titled the Difficulties of Arithmetic (Mushkilāt al-Ḥisāb), and is not extant. Based on the context, some historians of mathematics such as D. J. Struik, believe that Omar must have known the formula for the expansion of the binomial $(a+b)^n$, where n is a positive integer. The case of power 2 is explicitly stated in Euclid's elements and the case of at most power 3 had been established by Indian mathematicians. Khayyam was the mathematician who noticed the importance of a general binomial theorem. The argument supporting the claim that Khayyam had a general binomial theorem is based on his ability to extract roots. One of Khayyam's predecessors, al-Karaji, had already discovered the triangular arrangement of the coefficients of binomial expansions that Europeans later came to know as Pascal's triangle; Khayyam popularized this triangular array in Iran, so that it is now known as Omar Khayyam's triangle.

== Astronomy ==
Representation of the intercalation scheme of the Jalali calendar

In 1074–5, Omar Khayyam was commissioned by Sultan Malik-Shah to build an observatory at Isfahan and reform the Persian calendar. There was a panel of eight scholars working under the direction of Khayyam to make large-scale astronomical observations and revise the astronomical tables. Recalibrating the calendar fixed the first day of the year at the exact moment of the passing of the Sun's center across vernal equinox. This marks the beginning of spring or Nowrūz, a day in which the Sun enters the first degree of Aries before noon. The resultant calendar was named in Malik-Shah's honor as the Jalālī calendar, and was inaugurated on 15 March 1079. The observatory itself was disused after the death of Malik-Shah in 1092.

The Jalālī calendar was a true solar calendar where the duration of each month is equal to the time of the passage of the Sun across the corresponding sign of the Zodiac. The calendar reform introduced a unique 33-year intercalation cycle. As indicated by the works of Khazini, Khayyam's group implemented an intercalation system based on quadrennial and quinquennial leap years. Therefore, the calendar consisted of 25 ordinary years that included 365 days, and 8 leap years that included 366 days. The calendar remained in use across Greater Iran from the 11th to the 20th centuries. In 1911, the Jalali calendar became the official national calendar of Qajar Iran. In 1925, this calendar was simplified and the names of the months were modernised, resulting in the modern Iranian calendar. The Jalali calendar is more accurate than the Gregorian calendar of 1582, with an error of one day accumulating over 5,000 years, compared to one day every 3,330 years in the Gregorian calendar. Moritz Cantor considered it the most perfect calendar ever devised.

One of his pupils, Nizami Aruzi, relates that Khayyam apparently did not have a belief in astrology and divination: "I did not observe that he (scil. Omar Khayyam) had any great belief in astrological predictions, nor have I seen or heard of any of the great [scientists] who had such belief." While working for Sultan Sanjar as an astrologer he was asked to predict the weather – a job that he apparently did not do well. George Saliba explains that the term ‘ilm al-nujūm, used in various sources in which references to Khayyam's life and work could be found, has sometimes been incorrectly translated to mean astrology. He adds: "from at least the middle of the tenth century, according to Farabi's Enumeration of the Sciences, that this science, ‘ilm al-nujūm, was already split into two parts, one dealing with astrology and the other with theoretical mathematical astronomy."

== Other works ==
Khayyam has a short treatise devoted to Archimedes' principle (in full title, On the Deception of Knowing the Two Quantities of Gold and Silver in a Compound Made of the Two). For a compound of gold adulterated with silver, he describes a method to measure more exactly the weight per capacity of each element. It involves weighing the compound both in air and in water, since weights are easier to measure exactly than volumes. By repeating the same with both gold and silver one finds exactly how much heavier than water gold, silver and the compound were. This treatise was extensively examined by Eilhard Wiedemann who believed that Khayyam's solution was more accurate and sophisticated than that of Khazini and Al-Nayrizi who also dealt with the subject elsewhere.

Another short treatise is concerned with music theory in which he discusses the connection between music and arithmetic. Khayyam's contribution was in providing a systematic classification of musical scales, and discussing the mathematical relationship among notes, minor, major and tetrachords.

== Poetry ==
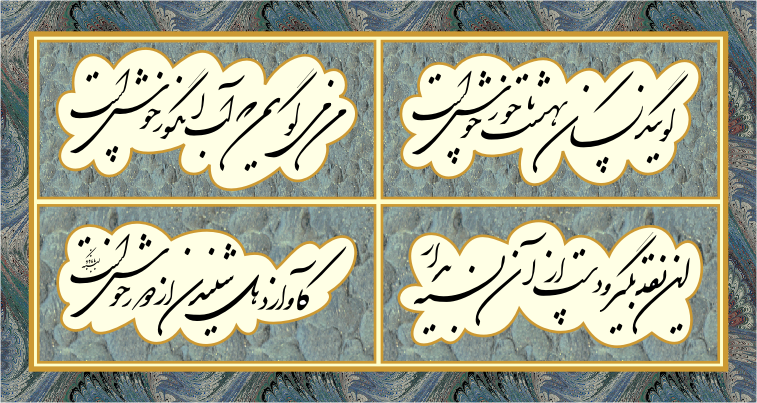
Rendition of a ruba'i from the Bodleian manuscript, rendered in Shekasteh calligraphy.

The earliest allusion to Omar Khayyam's poetry is from the historian Imad al-Din al-Isfahani, a younger contemporary of Khayyam, who explicitly identifies him as both a poet and a scientist (Kharidat al-qasr, 1174). One of the earliest specimens of Omar Khayyam's Rubiyat is from Fakhr al-Din al-Razi. In his work al-Tanbih ‘ala ba‘d asrar al-maw‘dat fi’l-Qur’an (c. 1160), he quotes one of his poems (corresponding to quatrain LXII of FitzGerald's first edition). Daya in his writings (Mirṣād al-‘Ibad, c. 1230) quotes two quatrains, one of which is the same as the one already reported by Razi. An additional quatrain is quoted by the historian Juvayni (Tarikh-i Jahangushay, c. 1226–1283). In 1340 Jajarmi includes thirteen quatrains of Khayyam in his work containing an anthology of the works of famous Persian poets (Mu’nis al-ahrār), two of which have hitherto been known from the older sources. A comparatively late manuscript is the Bodleian MS. Ouseley 140, written in Shiraz in 1460, which contains 158 quatrains on 47 folia. The manuscript belonged to William Ouseley (1767–1842) and was purchased by the Bodleian Library in 1844.

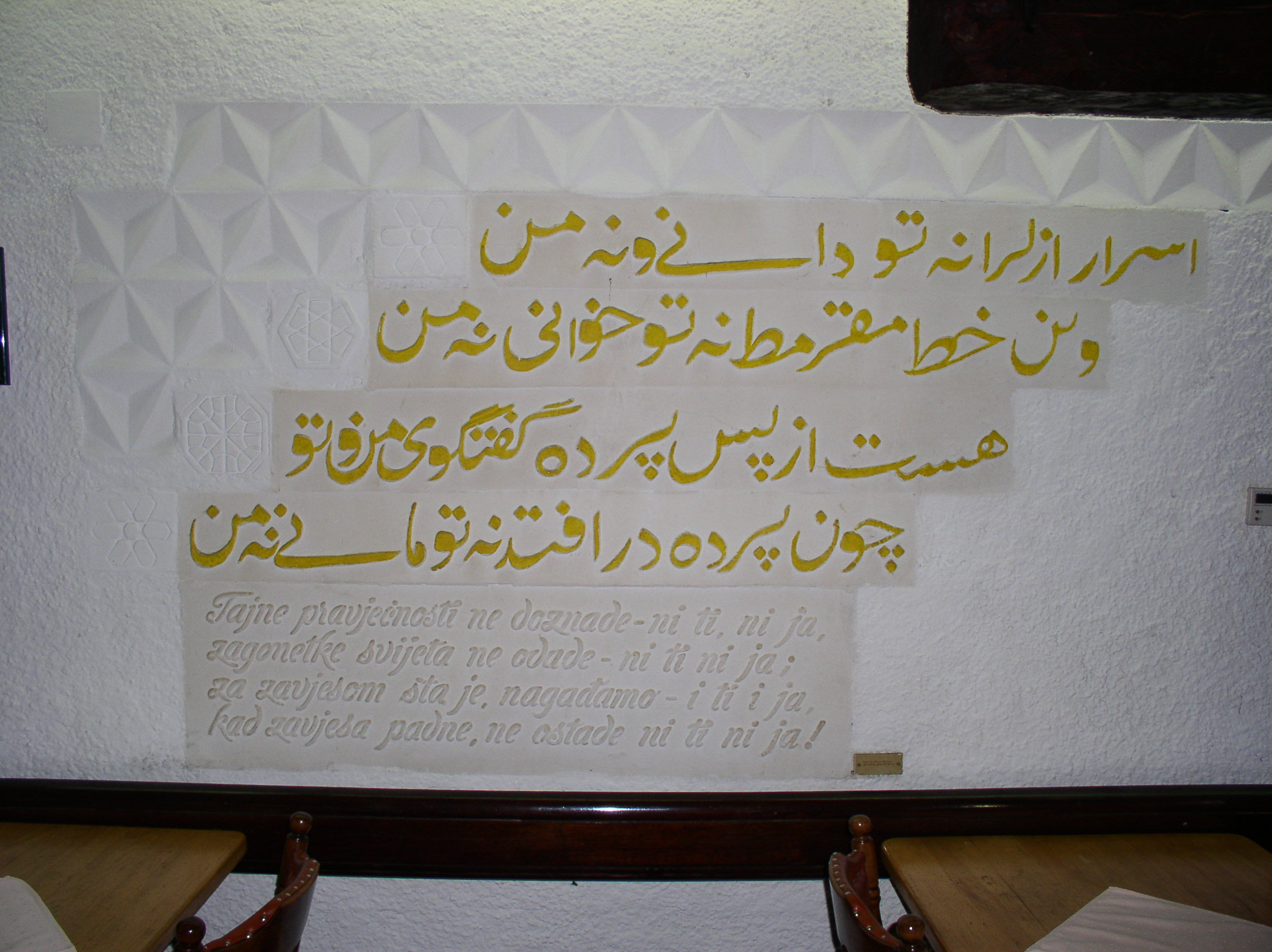
Inscription of a poem attributed to Omar Khayyam at Morića Han in Sarajevo, Bosnia and Herzegovina

There are occasional quotes of verses attributed to Khayyam in texts attributed to authors of the 13th and 14th centuries, but these are of doubtful authenticity, so that skeptical scholars point out that the entire tradition may be pseudepigraphic. Hans Heinrich Schaeder in 1934 commented that the name of Omar Khayyam "is to be struck out from the history of Persian literature" due to the lack of any material that could confidently be attributed to him. De Blois presents a bibliography of the manuscript tradition, concluding pessimistically that the situation has not changed significantly since Schaeder's time.^{:307}

Five of the quatrains later attributed to Omar Khayyam are found as early as 30 years after his death, quoted in Sindbad-Nameh. While this establishes that these specific verses were in circulation in Omar's time or shortly later, it does not imply that the verses must be his. De Blois concludes that at the least the process of attributing poetry to Omar Khayyam appears to have begun already in the 13th century.^{:305} Edward Granville Browne (1906) notes the difficulty of disentangling authentic from spurious quatrains: "while it is certain that Khayyam wrote many quatrains, it is hardly possible, save in a few exceptional cases, to assert positively that he wrote any of those ascribed to him".

In addition to the Persian quatrains, there are twenty-five Arabic poems attributed to Khayyam which are attested by historians such as al-Isfahani, Shahrazuri (Nuzhat al-Arwah, c. 1201–1211), Qifti (Tārikh al-hukamā, 1255), and Hamdallah Mustawfi (Tarikh-i guzida, 1339).

Boyle emphasized that there are a number of other Persian scholars who occasionally wrote quatrains, including Avicenna, Ghazali, and Tusi. They conclude that it is also possible that for Khayyam, poetry was an amusement of his leisure hours: "these brief poems seem often to have been the work of scholars and scientists who composed them, perhaps, in moments of relaxation to edify or amuse the inner circle of their disciples".

The poetry attributed to Omar Khayyam has contributed greatly to his popular fame in the modern period as a direct result of the extreme popularity of the translation of such verses into English by Edward FitzGerald (1859). FitzGerald's Rubaiyat of Omar Khayyam contains loose translations of quatrains from the Bodleian manuscript. It enjoyed such success in the fin de siècle period that a bibliography compiled in 1929 listed more than 300 separate editions, and many more have been published since.^{:312}

== Philosophy ==
Khayyam considered himself intellectually to be a student of Avicenna. According to Al-Bayhaqi, he was reading the metaphysics in Avicenna's the Book of Healing before he died. There are six philosophical papers believed to have been written by Khayyam. One of them, On existence (Fi’l-wujūd), was written originally in Persian and deals with the subject of existence and its relationship to universals. Another paper, titled The necessity of contradiction in the world, determinism and subsistence (Darurat al-tadād fi’l-‘ālam wa’l-jabr wa’l-baqā’), is written in Arabic and deals with free will and determinism. The titles of his other works are On being and necessity (Risālah fī’l-kawn wa’l-taklīf), The Treatise on Transcendence in Existence (al-Risālah al-ulā fi’l-wujūd), On the knowledge of the universal principles of existence (Risālah dar ‘ilm kulliyāt-i wujūd), and Abridgement concerning natural phenomena (Mukhtasar fi’l-Tabi‘iyyāt).

Khayyam himself once said:

We are the victims of an age when men of science are discredited, and only a few remain who are capable of engaging in scientific research. Our philosophers spend all their time in mixing true with false and are interested in nothing but outward show; such little learning as they have they extend on material ends. When they see a man sincere and unremitting in his search for the truth, one who will have nothing to do with falsehood and pretence, they mock and despise him.

=== Religious views ===
A literal reading of Khayyam's quatrains leads to the interpretation of his philosophic attitude toward life as a combination of pessimism, nihilism, Epicureanism, fatalism, and agnosticism. This view is taken by Iranologists such as Arthur Christensen, Hans Heinrich Schaeder, John Andrew Boyle, Edward Denison Ross, Edward Henry Whinfield and George Sarton. Conversely, the Khayyamic quatrains have also been described as mystical Sufi poetry. In addition to his Persian quatrains, J. C. E. Bowen mentions that Khayyam's Arabic poems also "express a pessimistic viewpoint which is entirely consonant with the outlook of the deeply thoughtful rationalist philosopher that Khayyam is known historically to have been." Edward FitzGerald emphasized the religious skepticism he found in Khayyam. In his preface to the Rubáiyát he claimed that he "was hated and dreaded by the Sufis", and denied any pretense at divine allegory: "his Wine is the veritable Juice of the Grape: his Tavern, where it was to be had: his Saki, the Flesh and Blood that poured it out for him." Sadegh Hedayat is one of the most notable proponents of Khayyam's philosophy as agnostic skepticism, and according to Jan Rypka (1934), he even considered Khayyam an atheist. Hedayat (1923) states that "while Khayyam believes in the transmutation and transformation of the human body, he does not believe in a separate soul; if we are lucky, our bodily particles would be used in the making of a jug of wine." Omar Khayyam's poetry has been cited in the context of New Atheism, such as in The Portable Atheist by Christopher Hitchens.

Al-Qifti (c. 1172–1248) appears to confirm this view of Khayyam's philosophy. In his work The History of Learned Men he reports that Khayyam's poems were only outwardly in the Sufi style, but were written with an anti-religious agenda. He also mentions that he was at one point indicted for impiety, but went on a pilgrimage to prove he was pious. The report has it that upon returning to his native city he concealed his deepest convictions and practised a strictly religious life, going morning and evening to the place of worship. Khayyam on the Koran (quote 84):

The Koran! well, come put me to the test, Lovely old book in hideous error drest, Believe me, I can quote the Koran too, The unbeliever knows his Koran best. And do you think that unto such as you, A maggot-minded, starved, fanatic crew, God gave the Secret, and denied it me? Well, well, what matters it! believe that too.

Look not above, there is no answer there; Pray not, for no one listens to your prayer; Near is as near to God as any Far, And Here is just the same deceit as There.

Men talk of heaven,—there is no heaven but here; Men talk of hell,—there is no hell but here; Men of hereafters talk, and future lives, O love, there is no other life—but here.

An account of him, written in the thirteenth century, shows him as "versed in all the wisdom of the Greeks," and as wont to insist on the necessity of studying science on Greek lines. Of his prose works, two, which were stand authority, dealt respectively with precious stones and climatology. Beyond question the poet-astronomer was undevout; and his astronomy doubtless helped to make him so. One contemporary writes: "I did not observe that he had any great belief in astrological predictions; nor have I seen or heard of any of the great (scientists) who had such belief. He gave his adherence to no religious sect. Agnosticism, not faith, is the keynote of his works. Among the sects he saw everywhere strife and hatred in which he could have no part...."

Persian novelist Sadegh Hedayat says Khayyám from "his youth to his death remained a materialist, pessimist, agnostic. Khayyam looked at all religions questions with a skeptical eye", continues Hedayat, "and hated the fanaticism, narrow-mindedness, and the spirit of vengeance of the mullas, the so-called religious scholars."

In the context of a piece entitled On the Knowledge of the Principles of Existence, Khayyam endorses the Sufi path. Csillik suggests the possibility that Omar Khayyam could see in Sufism an ally against orthodox religiosity. Other commentators do not accept that Khayyam's poetry has an anti-religious agenda and interpret his references to wine and drunkenness in the conventional metaphorical sense common in Sufism. The French translator J. B. Nicolas held that Khayyam's constant exhortations to drink wine should not be taken literally, but should be regarded rather in the light of Sufi thought where rapturous intoxication by "wine" is to be understood as a metaphor for the enlightened state or divine rapture of baqaa. The view of Omar Khayyam as a Sufi was defended by Bjerregaard, Idries Shah, and Dougan who attributes the reputation of hedonism to the failings of FitzGerald's translation, arguing that Khayyam's poetry is to be understood as "deeply esoteric". On the other hand, Iranian experts such as Mohammad Ali Foroughi and Mojtaba Minovi rejected the hypothesis that Omar Khayyam was a Sufi. Foroughi stated that Khayyam's ideas may have been consistent with that of Sufis at times but there is no evidence that he was formally a Sufi. Aminrazavi states that "Sufi interpretation of Khayyam is possible only by reading into his Rubāʿīyyāt extensively and by stretching the content to fit the classical Sufi doctrine.". Furthermore, Boyle emphasizes that Khayyam was intensely disliked by a number of celebrated Sufi mystics who belonged to the same century. This includes Shams Tabrizi (spiritual guide of Rumi), Najm al-Din Daya who described Omar Khayyam as "an unhappy philosopher, atheist, and materialist", and Attar who regarded him not as a fellow-mystic but a free-thinking scientist who awaited punishments hereafter.

Seyyed Hossein Nasr argues that it is "reductive" to use a literal interpretation of his verses (many of which are of uncertain authenticity to begin with) to establish Omar Khayyam's philosophy. Instead, he adduces Khayyam's interpretive translation of Avicenna's treatise Discourse on Unity (al-Khutbat al-Tawhīddya), where he expresses orthodox views on Divine Unity in agreement with the author. The prose works believed to be Khayyam's are written in the Peripatetic style and are explicitly theistic, dealing with subjects such as the existence of God and theodicy. As noted by Bowen these works indicate his involvement in the problems of metaphysics rather than in the subtleties of Sufism. As evidence of Khayyam's faith and/or conformity to Islamic customs, Aminrazavi mentions that in his treatises he offers salutations and prayers, praising God and Muhammad. In most biographical extracts, he is referred to with religious honorifics such as Imām, The Patron of Faith (Ghīyāth al-Dīn), and The Evidence of Truth (Hujjat al-Haqq). He also notes that biographers who praise his religiosity generally avoid making reference to his poetry, while the ones who mention his poetry often do not praise his religious character. For instance, Al-Bayhaqi's account, which antedates by some years other biographical notices, speaks of Omar as a very pious man who professed orthodox views down to his last hour.

On the basis of all the existing textual and biographical evidence, the question remains somewhat open, and as a result Khayyam has received sharply conflicting appreciations and criticisms.

== Reception ==
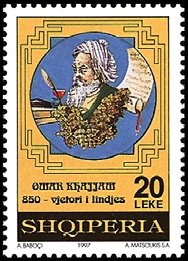
Stamp of Albania in 1997, entitled "850th birth anniversary of Omar Khayyam"

The various biographical extracts referring to Omar Khayyam describe him as unequalled in scientific knowledge and achievement during his time. (Note: E.g., by the author of Firdaws al-tawārikh, author of Tarikh-i Alfi, and al-Isfahani.) Many called him by the epithet King of the Wise (Arabic: ملك الحکماء, romanized: Malik al-Ḥukamā). Shahrazuri (d. 1300) esteems him highly as a mathematician, and claims that he may be regarded as "the successor of Avicenna in the various branches of philosophic learning". Al-Qifti (d. 1248), even though disagreeing with his views, concedes he was "unrivalled in his knowledge of natural philosophy and astronomy". Despite being hailed as a poet by a number of biographers, according to John Andrew Boyle "it is still possible to argue that Khayyam's status as a poet of the first rank is a comparatively late development."

Thomas Hyde was the first European to call attention to Khayyam and to translate one of his quatrains into Latin (Historia religionis veterum Persarum eorumque magorum, 1700). Western interest in Persia grew with the Orientalism movement in the 19th century. Joseph von Hammer-Purgstall (1774–1856) translated some of Khayyam's poems into German in 1818, and Gore Ouseley (1770–1844) into English in 1846, but Khayyam remained relatively unknown in the West until after the publication of Edward FitzGerald's Rubaiyat of Omar Khayyam in 1859. FitzGerald's work at first was unsuccessful but was popularised by Whitley Stokes from 1861 onward, and the work came to be greatly admired by the Pre-Raphaelites. In 1872 FitzGerald had a third edition printed which increased interest in the work in America. By the 1880s, the book was extremely well known throughout the English-speaking world, to the extent of the formation of numerous "Omar Khayyam Clubs" and a "fin de siècle cult of the Rubaiyat". Khayyam's poems have been translated into many languages; many of the more recent ones are more literal than that of FitzGerald.

FitzGerald's translation was a factor in rekindling interest in Khayyam as a poet even in his native Iran. Sadegh Hedayat in his Songs of Khayyam (Taranehha-ye Khayyam, 1934) reintroduced Khayyam's poetic legacy to modern Iran. Under the Pahlavi dynasty, a new monument of white marble, designed by the architect Houshang Seyhoun, was erected over his tomb. A statue by Abolhassan Sadighi was erected in Laleh Park, Tehran in the 1960s, and a bust by the same sculptor was placed near Khayyam's mausoleum in Nishapur. In 2009, the state of Iran donated a pavilion to the United Nations Office in Vienna, inaugurated at Vienna International Center. In 2016, three statues of Khayyam were unveiled: one at the University of Oklahoma, one in Nishapur and one in Florence, Italy. Over 150 composers have used the Rubaiyat as their source of inspiration. The earliest such composer was Liza Lehmann.

FitzGerald rendered Khayyam's name as "Tentmaker", and the anglicized name of "Omar the Tentmaker" resonated in English-speaking popular culture for a while. Thus, Nathan Haskell Dole published a novel called Omar, the Tentmaker: A Romance of Old Persia in 1898. Omar the Tentmaker of Naishapur is a historical novel by John Smith Clarke, published in 1910. "Omar the Tentmaker" is also the title of a 1914 play by Richard Walton Tully in an oriental setting, adapted as a silent film in 1922. US General Omar Bradley was given the nickname "Omar the Tent-Maker" in World War II.

The diverse talents and intellectual pursuits of Khayyam captivated many Ottoman and Turkish writers throughout history. Scholars often viewed Khayyam as a means to enhance their own poetic prowess and intellectual depth, drawing inspiration and recognition from his writings. For many Muslim reformers, Khayam's verses provided a counterpoint to the conservative norms prevalent in Islamic societies, allowing room for independent thought and a libertine lifestyle. Figures like Abdullah Cevdet, Rıza Tevfik, and Yahya Kemal utilized Khayyam's themes to justify their progressive ideologies or to celebrate liberal aspects of their lives, portraying him as a cultural, political, and intellectual role model who demonstrated Islam's compatibility with modern conventions. Similarly, Turkish leftist poets and intellectuals, including Nâzım Hikmet, Sabahattin Eyüboğlu, A. Kadir, and Gökçe, appropriated Khayyam to champion their socialist worldview, imbuing his voice with a humanistic tone in the vernacular. Khayyam's resurgence in spoken Turkish since the 1980s has transformed him into a poet of the people, with numerous books and translations revitalizing his historical significance. Conversely, scholars like Dāniş, Tevfik, and Gölpınarlı advocated for source criticism and the identification of authentic quatrains to discern the genuine Khayyam amidst historical perceptions of his sociocultural image.

=== The Moving Finger quatrain ===
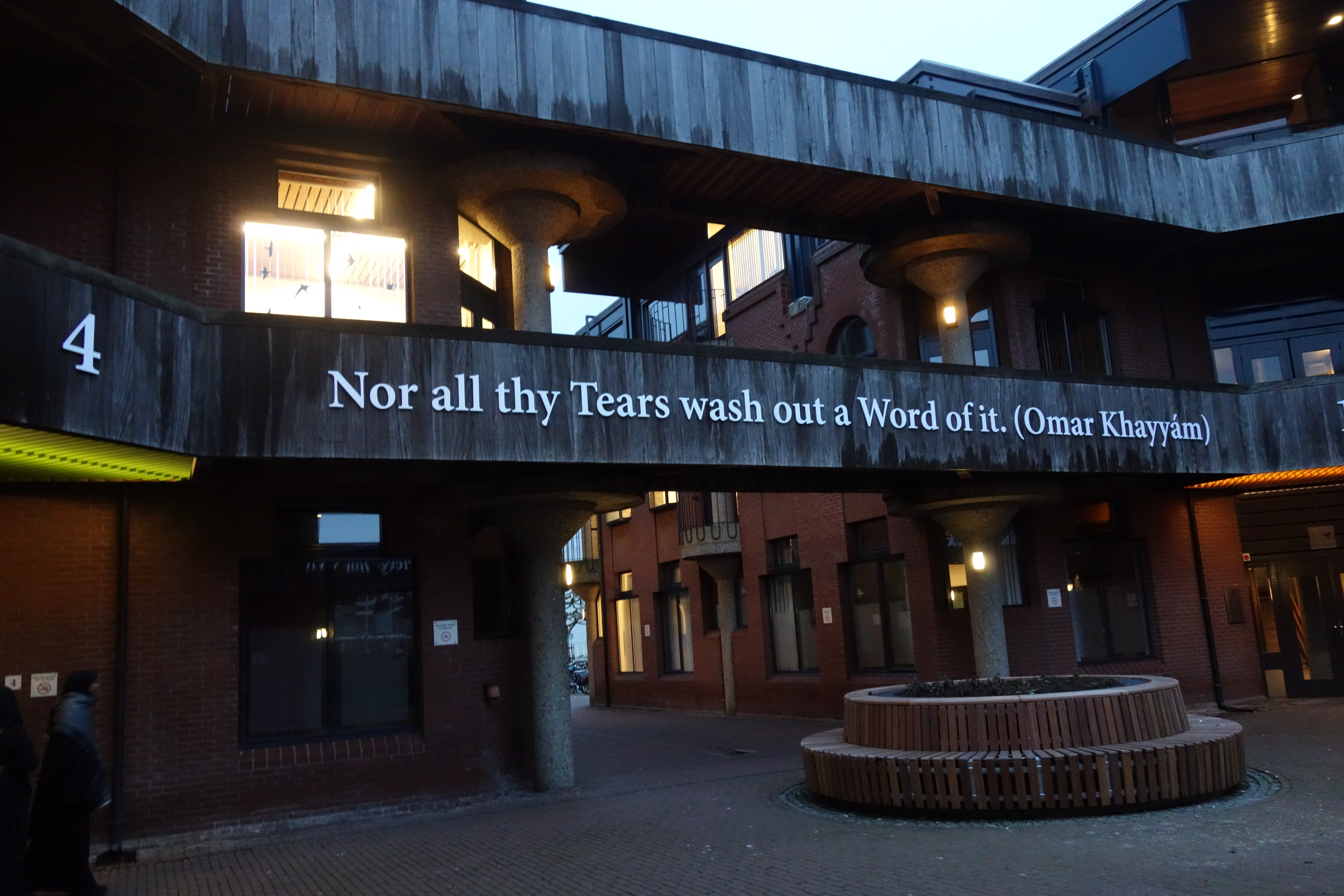
A line of English translation of ''The Moving Finger'' quatrain. Persian Rubiyats of Omar Khayyam on one the faculty buildings of Leiden University

The quatrain by Omar Khayyam known as "The Moving Finger", in the form of its translation by the English poet Edward Fitzgerald is one of the most popular quatrains in the Anglosphere. It reads:

The Moving Finger writes; and having writ,

Moves on: nor all your Piety nor Wit

Shall lure it back to cancel half a Line,

Nor all your Tears wash out a Word of it. (Note: بر لوح نشان بودنی‌ها بوده‌ست پیوسته قلم ز نیک و بد فرسوده‌ست در روز ازل هر آنچه بایست بداد غم خوردن و کوشیدن ما بیهوده‌ست)

The title of the novel The Moving Finger written by Agatha Christie and published in 1942 was inspired by this quatrain of the translation of Rubaiyat of Omar Khayyam by Edward Fitzgerald. Martin Luther King also cites this quatrain of Omar Khayyam in one of his speeches, "Beyond Vietnam: A Time to Break Silence":

“We may cry out desperately for time to pause in her passage, but time is adamant to every plea and rushes on. Over the bleached bones and jumbled residues of numerous civilizations are written the pathetic words, ‘Too late.’ There is an invisible book of life that faithfully records our vigilance or our neglect. Omar Khayyam is right: ‘The moving finger writes, and having writ moves on.’”

In one of his apologetic speeches about the Clinton–Lewinsky scandal, Bill Clinton, the 42nd president of the US, also cites this quatrain.

Writer Alan Watts also cites this quatrain in episode 15 of a 1959 television series he hosted called "Eastern Wisdom and Modern Life."

=== Other popular culture references ===
In 1934 Harold Lamb published a historical novel Omar Khayyam. The French-Lebanese writer Amin Maalouf based the first half of his historical fiction novel Samarkand on Khayyam's life and the creation of his Rubaiyat. The sculptor Eduardo Chillida produced four massive iron pieces titled Mesa de Omar Khayyam (Omar Khayyam's Table) in the 1980s.

A 1963-1964 serial in The Adventures of Rocky and Bullwinkle and Friends television cartoon has as its macguffin a "Ruby Yacht" (a jewel-encrusted model boat) with Omar Khayyam's name on it.

In the South-African born children's novelist Noel Langley's 1937 book The Land of Green Ginger, there is a character called Omar Khayyam, but it is unknown whether this is a reference to the Omar Khayyam

The lunar crater Omar Khayyam was named in his honour in 1970, as was the minor planet 3095 Omarkhayyam discovered by Soviet astronomer Lyudmila Zhuravlyova in 1980.

Google has released two Google Doodles commemorating him. The first was on his 964th birthday on 18 May 2012. The second was on his 971st birthday on 18 May 2019.

== Gallery ==
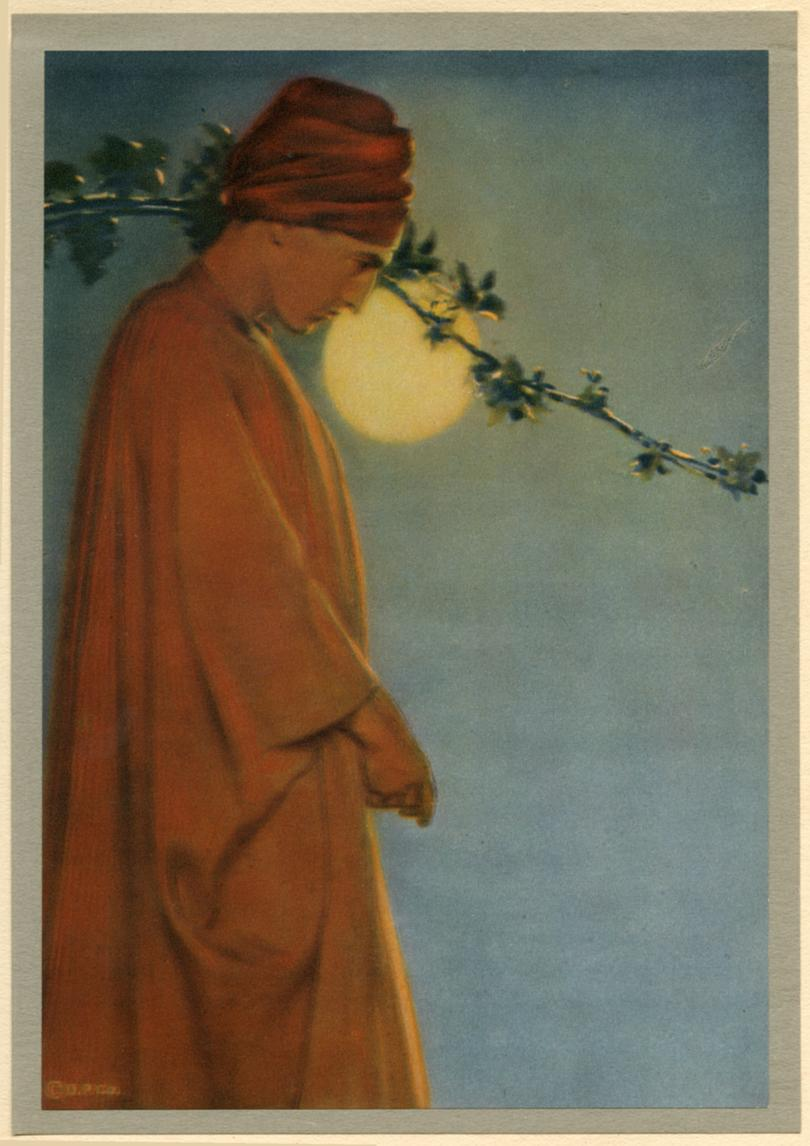
"A Ruby kindles in the vine", illustration for FitzGerald's Rubaiyat of Omar Khayyam by Adelaide Hanscom Leeson (c. 1905).

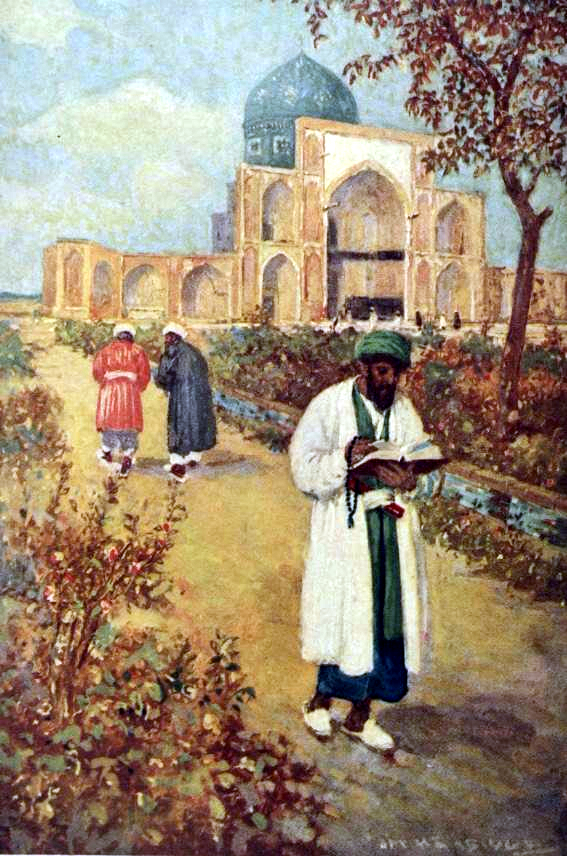
"At the Tomb of Omar Khayyam" by Jay Hambidge (1911).

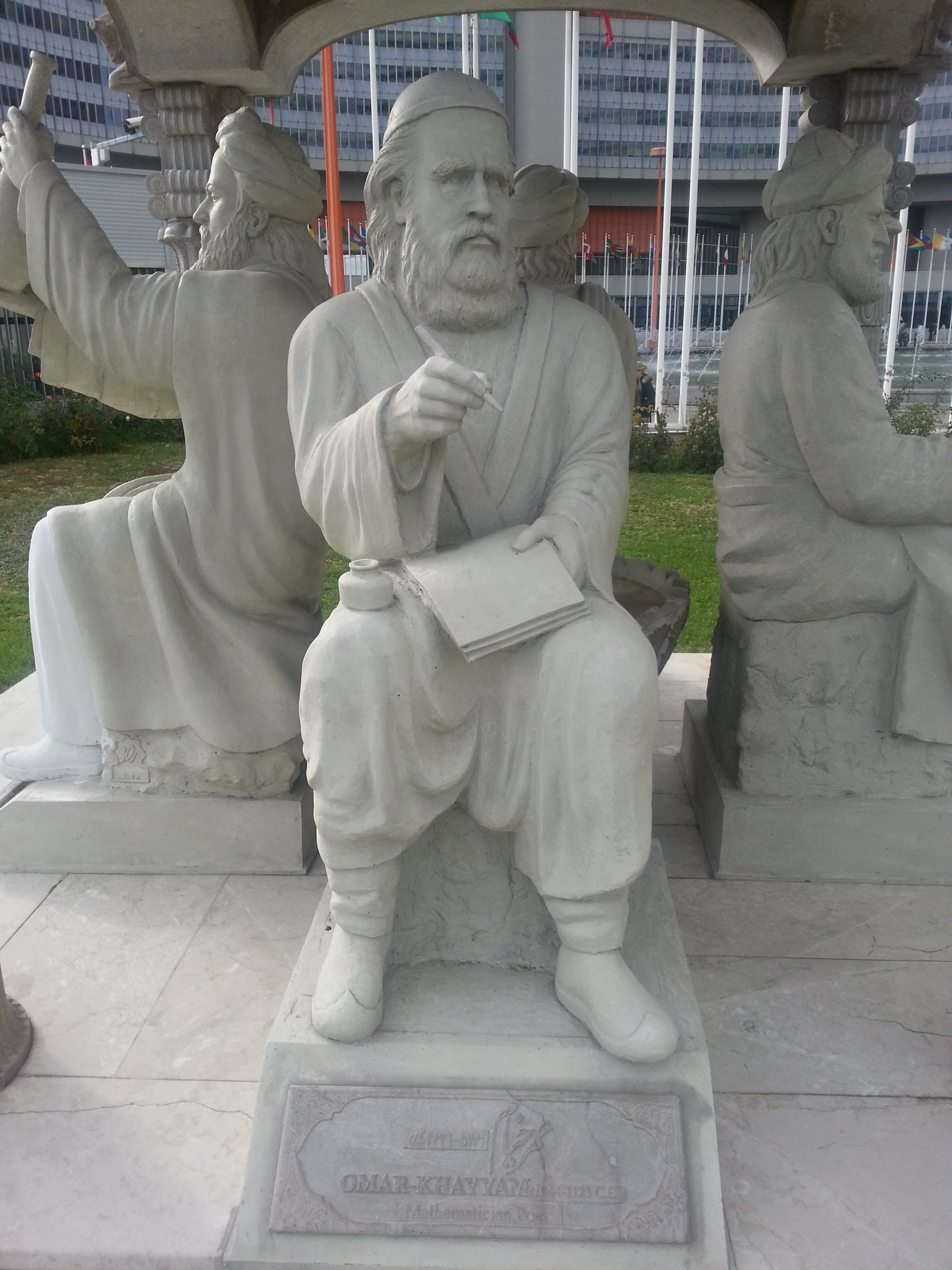
The statue of Khayyam in United Nations Office in Vienna as a part of Persian Scholars Pavilion donated by Iran.

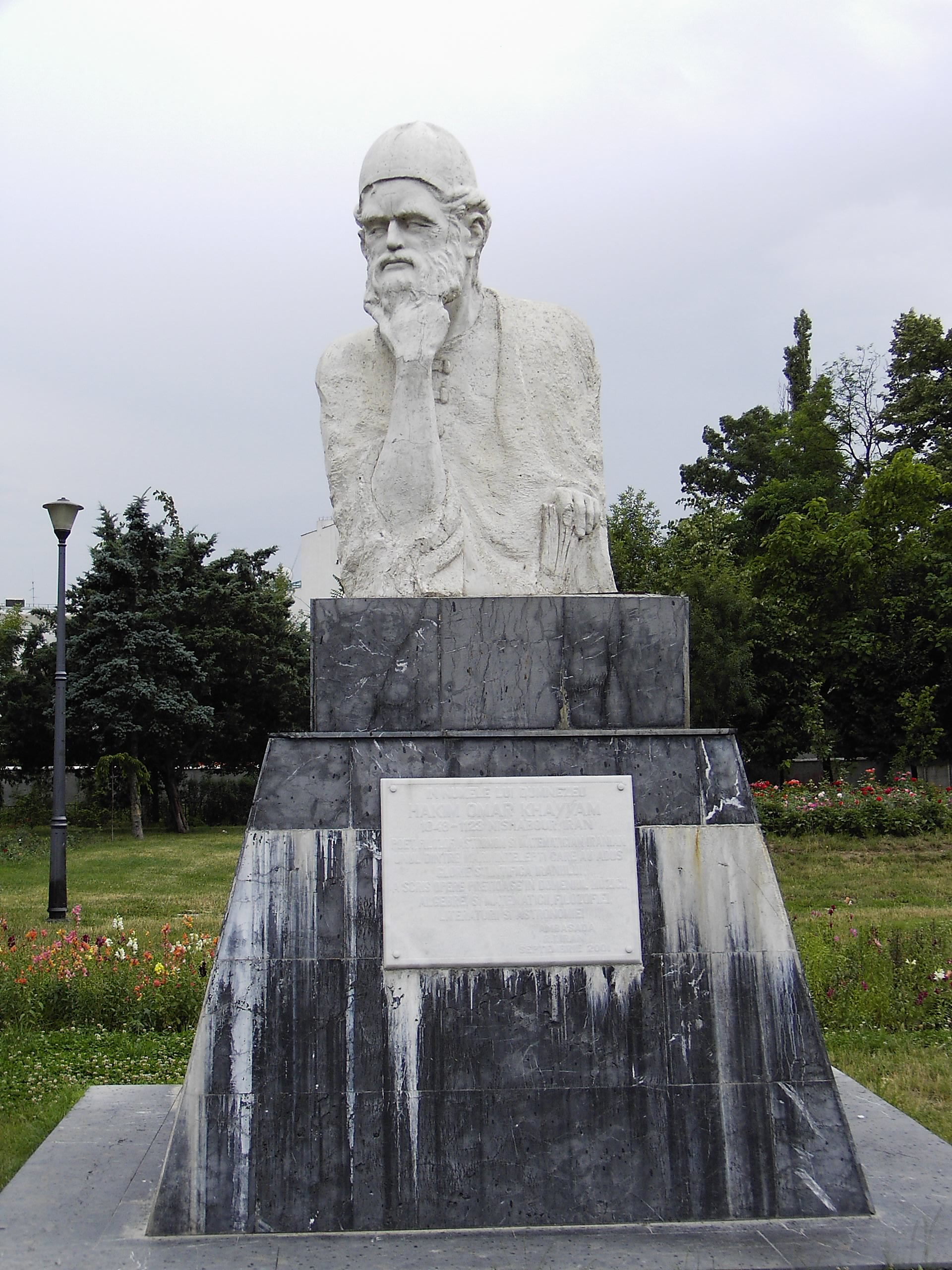
Statue of Omar Khayyam in Bucharest

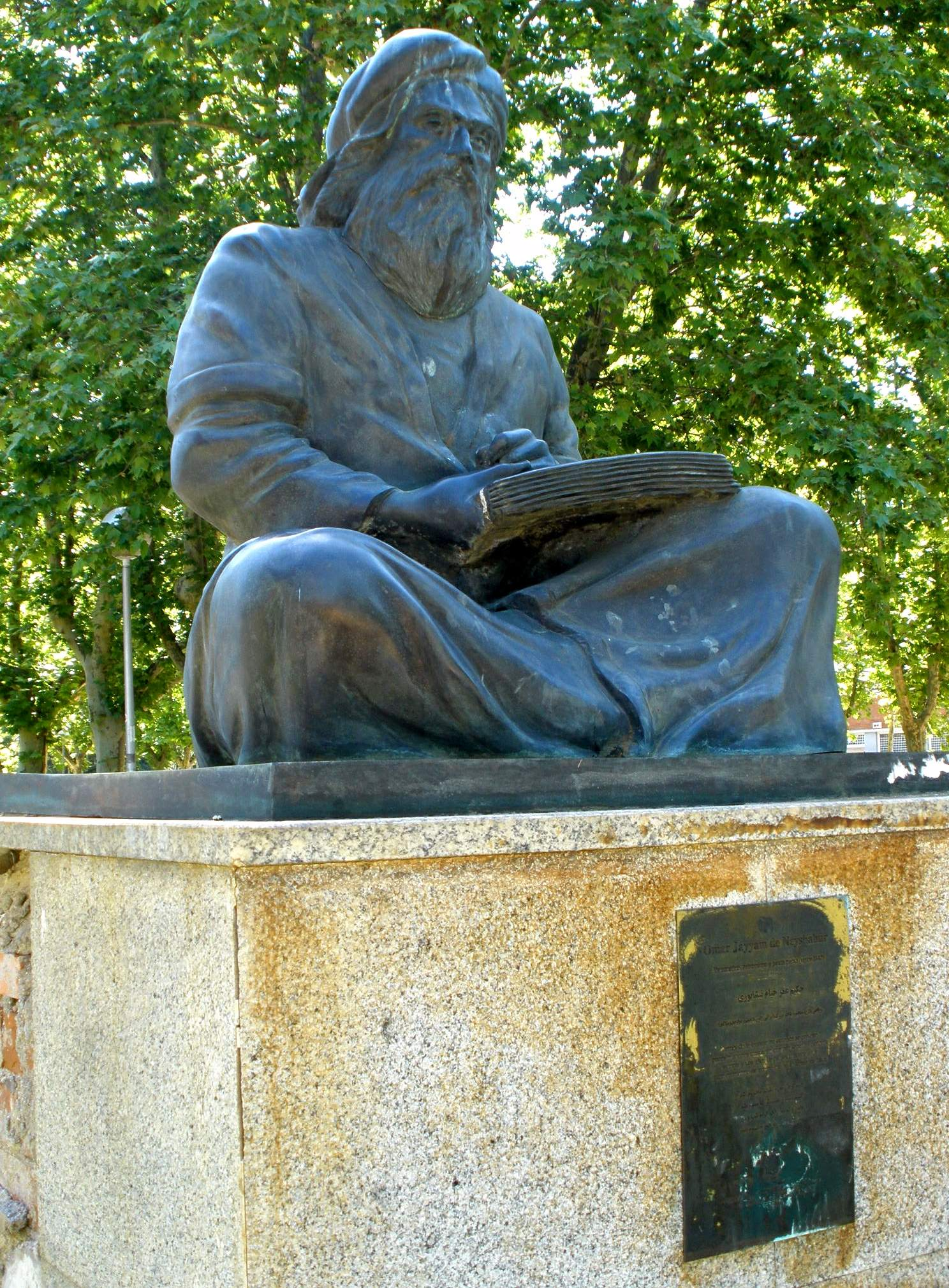
Monument to Omar Khayyam in Ciudad Universitaria of Madrid

== See also ==
- Nozhat al-Majales

=== Notable films ===
- Omar Khayyam (1957 film)
- The Keeper: The Legend of Omar Khayyam

=== Noted Khayyamologists ===
- Badiozzaman Forouzanfar
- Abdolhossein Zarrinkoob
