= Jalali calendar =

Iranian calendar

The Jalali calendar, also referred to as Malikshahi and Maliki, is a solar calendar compiled during the reign of Jalaluddin Malik-Shah I, the Sultan of the Seljuk Empire (1072–1092 CE), by the order of Grand Vizier Nizam al-Mulk, using observations made in the cities of Isfahan (the capital of the Seljuks), Rey, and Nishapur. Variants of the Jalali calendar are still in use today in Iran and Afghanistan. In Iran, the Persian names of the zodiac are used, while in Afghanistan the original Arabic names are used. The Jalali calendar gains approximately 1 day on the Julian calendar every 128 years.

The tropical Jalali calendar (Persian: گاه‌شماری جلالی or تقویم جلالی), which inherited some aspects from the Yazdgerdi calendar, was adopted on 15 March 1079 by the Sultan, based on the recommendations of a committee of astronomers, including Omar Khayyam, at the imperial observatory in the capital city of Isfahan. It was Khayyam who positioned Isfahan as the prime meridian, otherwise known as the nasf. Month computations were based on solar transits through the zodiac, and it remained in use for eight centuries. The need for a revised calendar arose from the inconsistencies and seasonal drift in the prior Islamic calendar due to the use of lunar cycles instead of solar; a lunar year consisted of 354 days. While acceptable to a desert nomadic people, this proved to be unworkable for settled, agricultural peoples. The Iranian calendar is one of several non-lunar calendars adopted by settled Muslims for agricultural purposes (others include the Coptic calendar, the Julian calendar, and the Semitic calendars of the Near East). The adoption, however, of the Persian year would not have brought complete stability into the calendar because the Persian year's beginning was aligned with the collection of taxes and payment of pensions. Sultan Jalal commissioned the task in 1073. Its work was completed well before the Sultan's death in 1092, after which the observatory would be abandoned.

The year was computed from the March equinox (Nowruz), and each month was determined by the transit of the sun into the corresponding zodiac region, a system that incorporated improvements on the fourth-century-CE Indian system of the Surya Siddhanta (Surya=solar, Siddhanta=analysis), also the basis of most Hindu calendars. Though there is little information about the social and cultural details of the solar calendars which were used in the Persian territory in later centuries up to the invention of the Jalālī Calendar, we know that the Persian solar calendars suffered a degree of disorganization due to the lack of official supervision. Since the solar transit times can have 24-hour variations, the length of the months vary slightly in different years (each month can be between 29 and 32 days). For example, the months in the two last years of the Jalali calendar had:

- 1303 AP: 30, 31, 32, 31, 32, 30, 31, 30, 29, 30, 29, and 30 days,
- 1302 AP: 30, 31, 32, 31, 31, 31, 31, 29, 30, 29, 30, and 30 days.

Because months were computed based on precise times of solar transit between zodiacal regions, seasonal drift never exceeded one day, and also there was no need for a leap year in the Jalali calendar. However, this calendar was very difficult to compute; it required full ephemeris computations and actual observations to determine the apparent movement of the Sun.

Some claim that simplifications introduced in the intervening years may have introduced a system with eight leap days in every cycle of 33 years. (Different rules, such as the 2820-year cycle, have also been attributed to Khayyam.) However, the original Jalali calendar based on observations (or predictions) of solar transit would not have needed either leap years or seasonal adjustments.

Owing to the variations in month lengths, and also the difficulty in computing the calendar itself, the Iranian calendar was modified to simplify these aspects in 1925 (1304 AP), resulting in the Solar Hijri calendar.

== See also ==
- Iranian calendars
- Solar Hijri calendar
- Armenian calendar
- Jalali calendar application
