= Nizami Aruzi =

12th-century Persian poet and writer

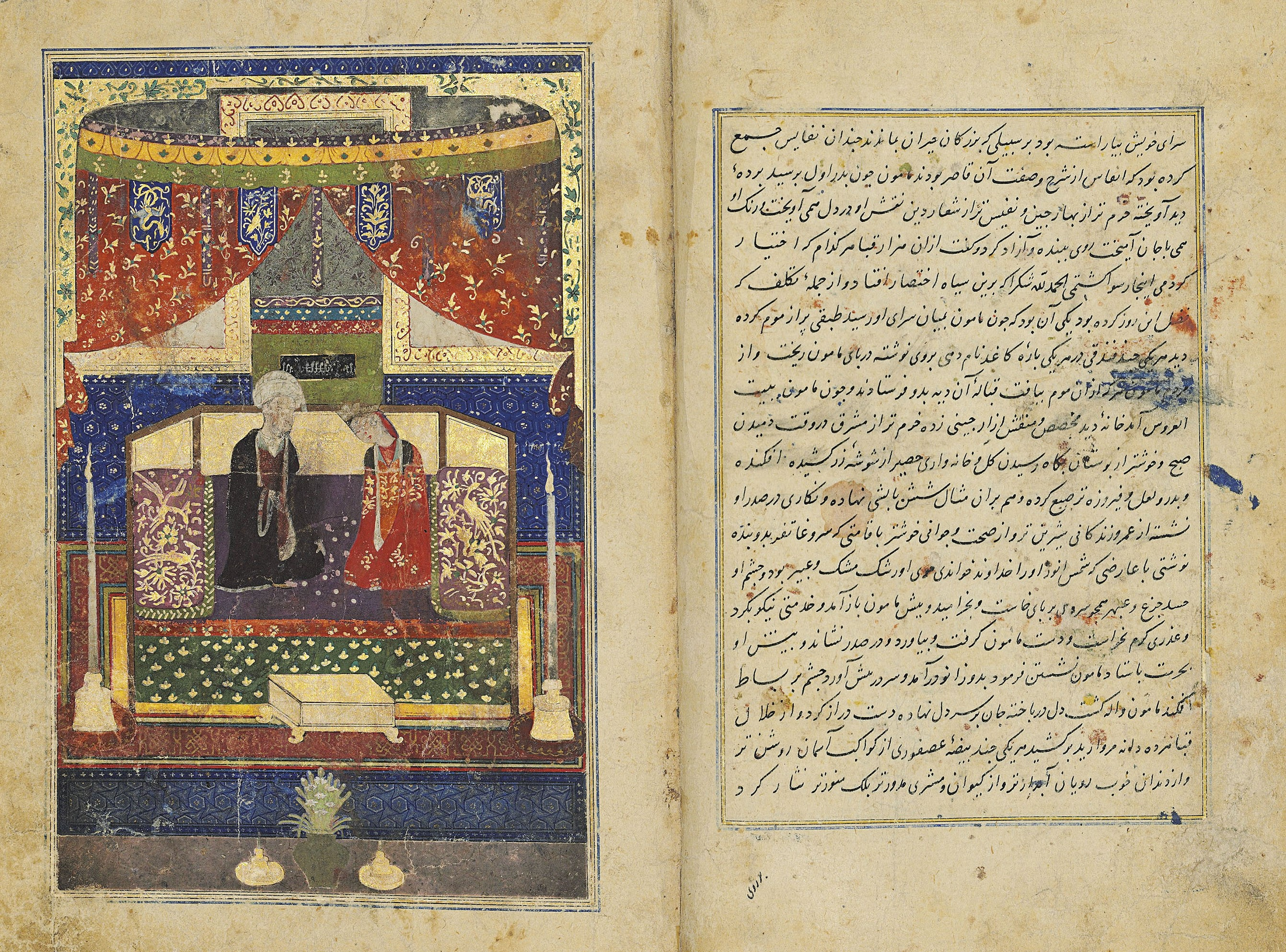
Folio of a copy of the Chahar Maqala by Nizami Aruzi. Dated 1383, likely from Jalayirid-era Tabriz

Ahmad ibn Umar ibn Alī, known as Nizamī-i Arūzī-i Samarqandī (Persian: نظامی عروضی) and also Arudi ("The Prosodist"), was a poet and prose writer who flourished between 1110 and 1161. He is particularly famous for his Chahar Maqala ("Four Discourses"), his only work to fully survive. While living in Samarkand, Abu’l-Rajaʾ Ahmad b. ʿAbd-Al-Ṣamad, a dehqan in Transoxiana, told Nezami of how the poet Rudaki was given compensation for his poem extolling the virtues of Samanid Amir Nasr b. Ahmad.

== Life ==
A Persian native of Samarkand in Transoxiana, his date of birth and death is uncertain. He was most likely born at the end of the 11th century. What little is known of his life can only be found in his book Chahar Maqala. He spent most of his time in Khorasan and Transoxiana, and served as a court-poet to the Ghurids for 45 years. In 1110/11, he was at Samarkand, where he gathered material about the Persian poet Rudaki (d. 941). In 1112/3, he met Omar Khayyam and al-Isfizari at a banquet in Balkh. In 1115/16, he resided in Herat.

The following year, he lived in poverty in Nishapur, and thus went to Tus with the goal of gaining the favour of the Seljuk prince Ahmad Sanjar, who governed Khorasan. There he visited the tomb of the Persian poet Ferdowsi, and gathered material regarding him. He also met Mu'izzi, a poet laureate of the Seljuks, who helped him progress his career in poetry. With the help of the latter, Nizami succeeded in gaining the attention of Sanjar. In 1120/1, he was told about the story of Ferdowsi and the Ghaznavid sultan Mahmud by Mu'izzi.

In 1136, he went back to Nishapur and visited the tomb of Omar Khayyam. Nizami accompanied the Ghurid ruler Ala al-Din Husayn (r. 1141–1161) in his war against Sanjar, and after the former's defeat at a battle near Herat in 1152/3, he hid himself in the city for a period. Nizami most likely composed the Chahar Maqala a few years later (in 1156), which he dedicated to the Ghurid prince Abu'l-Hasan Husam al-Din Ali. The rest of Nizami's life is obscure, he may have studied astrology and medicine.

== Works ==
Nizámí-i'Arúdí’s The Chahár Maqála, or Four Discourses, is a book consisting of four discourses on four different professionals that Nizami believed a king needs to have in his palace; in the preface of the book, Nizami discusses the philosophical or religious ideology of the creation of the world and the order of things. While he was primarily a courtier, he noted in his book that he was an astronomer and physician as well. He reports in the work that he spent time not only in his native Samarqand, but also in Herat, Tus (where he visited Ferdowsi's tomb and gathered material on the great poet), Balkh, and Nishapur, where he lived for perhaps five years. He also claimed to have studied under the astronomer-poet Omar Khayyám, a native of Nishapur.

In the introduction to the Chahar Maqala, Nizami presents his cosmological and political framework, describing a hierarchical universe governed by divine providence. He argues that human society requires structured governance to prevent chaos, which necessitates the institutions of prophethood (to establish divine law) and kingship (to execute it). In his political theory, Nizami synthesizes pre-Islamic Persian traditions of statecraft with Islamic theology, framing the ruler as an essential pillar for maintaining social order. Furthermore, his elaboration on the structural division of society and the interconnectedness of natural sciences heavily draws on Greek philosophical traditions, particularly Aristotelian and Neoplatonic concepts.

In his discourse on the art of the secretary (kitaba), Aruzi outlines a specific curriculum required for official state correspondence. He states that a proficient scribe must be educated in foundational Islamic texts, including the Quran and the Hadith, alongside Arabic proverbs and Persian vocabulary. To refine literary style, he prescribes the study of prominent prose writers, explicitly listing the epistles of Al-Sahib Ibn 'Abbad and Abu Ishaq al-Sabi, as well as the Maqamat of Badi' al-Zaman al-Hamadhani and Al-Hariri of Basra. Furthermore, he includes both Arabic and Persian poetry in his required reading, citing the Arabic works of Al-Mutanabbi and the Persian poetry of Ferdowsi and Rudaki as standard models for eloquence.

In his second discourse, which focuses on poetry, Aruzi defines the poetic craft as an art capable of altering human perception, specifically by making the beautiful appear ugly and the ugly appear beautiful. He outlines a quantitative requirement for aspiring poets, stating that a novice must memorize 20,000 verses from ancient masters and 10,000 verses from modern poets. According to Aruzi, this extensive memorization and continuous reading of established works are necessary to internalize rhythm and vocabulary before attempting original composition.

The Chahar Maqala has been translated into several languages, such as English, French, Swedish, Turkish, Urdu, Russian and Arabic.

== See also ==
- Persian Literature
- List of Persian poets and authors

== Sources ==
- Dahlén, Ashk (2009), "Kingship and Religion in a Mediaeval Fürstenspiegel: The Case of the Chahār Maqāla of Nizāmi ʽAruzi", Orientalia Suecana, vol. 58, Uppsala: Uppsala University, pp. 9–24.
- Massé, H. (1995). "Niẓāmī ʿArūḍī Samarḳandī". In Bosworth, C. E.; van Donzel, E.; Heinrichs, W. P. & Lecomte, G. (eds.). The Encyclopaedia of Islam, Second Edition. Volume VIII: Ned–Sam. Leiden: E. J. Brill. ISBN 978-90-04-09834-3.
- Yusofi, Gholam-Hosayn (1990). "Čahār Maqāla". In Yarshater, Ehsan (ed.). Encyclopædia Iranica. Vol. IV/6: Burial II–Calendars II. London and New York: Routledge & Kegan Paul. pp. 621–623. ISBN 978-0-71009-129-1.
