= Theodore Meliteniotes =

Byzantine Greek astronomer and teacher (c.1320–1393)

Theodore Meliteniotes (Greek: Θεόδωρος Μελιτηνιώτης; Constantinople, c. 1320 - 8 March 1393) was a Byzantine Greek astronomer, a sakellarios (treasurer) in the Byzantine bureaucracy, a supporter of Gregory Palamas and an opponent of the reunion with the Catholic Church. He became didaskalos ton didaskalon, i.e. the director of the Patriarchal School in 1360.

== Works ==
Theodore wrote an exegesis on the Gospels and a poem on Sôphrosynè (Temperance) which may be attributed to him.

=== Tribiblos ===
Theodore's main work is his Astronomical Tribiblos, in three books, whose autograph manuscript is preserved (Vaticanus gr. 792), was composed before 1352. The work deals with an assortment of mathematical and astronomical issues and draws from some earlier Greek authors like George Pachymeres and Theodore Metochites. The second book is devoted to Ptolemy, whose calculations he explained in the manner of Theon of Alexandria. Finally, in book 3 he devotes himself to Persian astronomy, drawing especially from George Chrysokokkes, whose work he corrected in many places. In all of them, he explicitly condemns Astrology, dissociating his Astronomy from the Persian tradition represented by Chrysokokkes.

The pedagogical character of the Tribiblos is obvious and it may have been used to give senior astronomy training to the Byzantine clergy.
