= Harald Wohlrapp =

German philosopher (born 1944)

Harald R. Wohlrapp
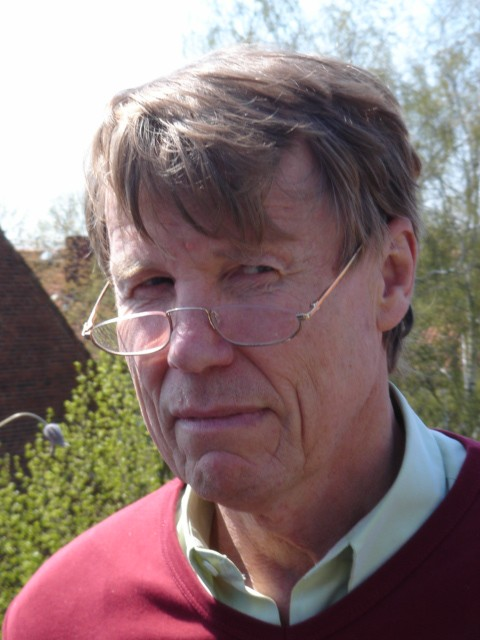
- Born: 6 June 1944 (age 82); Hildesheim

Philosophical work
- Era: Contemporary philosophy
- Region: Western Philosophy
- School: Methodical Constructivism; Wilhelm Kamlah, Paul Lorenzen
- Main interests: Argumentation theory Dialectics; Pragmatism; Philosophy of science Philosophy of language
- Notable ideas: "Einwandfreiheit": A thesis statement is considered valid if its justification can be developed free from objections in front of an open forum of arguments.

Harald R. Wohlrapp (born 6 June 1944 in Hildesheim, Germany) is a German philosopher. His main focus is argumentation theory.

== Philosophy ==
Harald Rüdiger Wohlrapp was a student of the German philosophers Wilhelm Kamlah and Paul Lorenzen (Methodical Constructivism, Erlangen School). After studies (philosophy, social sciences, linguistics) in Freiburg, Paris and Erlangen, Wohlrapp was appointed to a teaching position at the university of Hamburg, where he was a professor of philosophy from 1983 through 2009 and is presently a senior research fellow. His main areas of interest lie in dialectics (Plato, Hegel, Marx), pragmatism (Peirce, Mead, Hugo Dingler), philosophy of science (Lorenzen, Feyerabend) and philosophy of language (Wittgenstein, Kuno Lorenz). The pervading concern of his efforts, however, is the philosophy of argument. The results of 25 years of work are laid down in his book The Concept of Argument, an extensive volume that begins with an outline and evaluation of the origin of argumentation theory in Aristotle’s philosophy and culminates with an integration of the transcendent core of secular reason into the understanding of argumentation.

== Argumentation Theory ==
Wohlrapp takes argumentation to be the secret medium of any progress in academic and public thinking, a medium that deserves increasing attention in the growing complexity of the modern world. Thus, he welcomes the rise of the new academic field of argumentation theory, but at the same time points to its ongoing imprint by the Aristotelian legacy. This leads to a focus on inference and persuasion, and to a lack of understanding the dynamic and subjective traits of argumentative practice as well as to a neglect of its urgent need of a substantial conception of human reason.

Argumentation is seen by Wohlrapp as a practice located in inquiry (in ordinary life, in science and in philosophy), its general task being the overcoming of gaps and deficits in orientation with the help of constructing and examining new theoretical elements, i.e. with claiming theses, justifying them with proven elements of theory and defending them against objections:

- An argument or a thesis statement is judged „valid“ if its justification can be worked out „free from objections“ in front of an „open forum of arguments“.

With this conception a new and realistic concept of knowledge in its historical character is available. Valid theses can become knowledge as they go on proving reliable orientations in actions and so gradually become part of the reality of life. The second part of Wohlrapp’s conception of argument is the integration of subjectivity. The shape of theses and arguments in argumentative practice usually bears a subjective imprint. This can be theorized with the help of the sociological frame concept, allowing thus the treatment of more or less deep differences in the presented views of issues. The completion of this subjective trait is the third new part of Wohlrapp’s concept, namely formulation of a principle of argumentative reason. It is taken from Paul Lorenzen’s philosophy and is called the „Principle of Transsubjectivity“.

Wohlrapp has been using his views in the analysis and assessment of problems in philosophy of science, politics, applied ethics and theories of religion. He was thus able to produce some results which have won some interest by the academic public.

== Selected publications ==
- The Concept of Argument. A Philosophical Foundation. Amsterdam/ New York: Springer 2014 ISBN 978-9401787611
- Der Begriff des Arguments. Über die Beziehungen zwischen Wissen, Forschen, Glaube, Subjektivität und Vernunft. Würzburg: Königshausen u. Neumann, 2008 ISBN 978-3-8260-3820-4
- Toulmin´s theory and the dynamics of argumentation. In: Argumentation : Perspectives and approaches. Proceedings of the conference on argumentation 1986 / Frans H. van Eemeren (ed.). - Dordrecht : Foris Publ., 1987, p 327-335
- Constructivist anthropology and cultural pluralism: methodological reflections on cultural integration. In: Ethics in international management / Brij Nino Kumar and Horst Steinmann (eds.). - Berlin [u. a.] : de Gruyter, 1998, p. 47-63
- A new light on non-deductive argumentation schemes. In: Argumentation 12 (1998), S. 341-350
- Some remarks on non-deductive argument. In: Argument in a time of change / J. Klumpp (ed.). - Annandale, VA, 1998, p. 24-29
- Who is afraid of emotion in argument? In: Proceedings of the 6th ISSA Conference on Argumentation / Frans H. van Eemeren et al. (eds.) Amsterdam: SICSAT 2007, p. 1509-1514
- Conductive Argument: A misleading model of Pro- and Contra- Argumentation. In: Conductive Argument. An overlooked type of defeasible reasoning / Anthony Blair and Ralph Johnson (eds.), London UK: College Publications 2011, p. 210-223
- What is an argument – and Why? In: Cogency 4 (2012), p. 91-109
- Argumentum ad baculum and ideal speech situation. In: Proceedings of the Second International Conference on Argumentation, June 1990 / ed. by Frans H. van Eemeren. - Amsterdam : SISCAT, 1991, p 397-402
- Resolving the riddle of the nondeductive argumentation schemes. In: Proceedings of the 3rd Conferfence on Argumentation / Frans H. van Eemeren. - Amsterdam : SISCAT, 1995, p 55-62
- Wege der Argumentationsforschung - Stuttgart-Bad Cannstatt : Frommann-Holzboog, 1995
