= Protoscience =

Research field that may become a science

In the philosophy of science, protoscience (adj. protoscientific) is a research field that has the characteristics of an undeveloped science that may ultimately develop into an established science. Philosophers use protoscience to understand the history of science and distinguish protoscience from science and pseudoscience.

The word "protoscience" is a hybrid Greek-Latin compound of the roots proto- + scientia, meaning a first or primeval rational knowledge.

Examples of protoscience include alchemy, Wegener's original theory of continental drift and political economy (the predecessor to the modern economic sciences).

== History ==
Protoscience as a research field with the characteristics of an undeveloped science appeared in the early 20th century. In 1910, Jones described the field of political economy as it began the transition to the modern field of economics:

I confess to a personal predilection for some term such as proto-science, pre-science, or nas-science, to give expression to what I conceive to be the true state of affairs, which I take to be this, that economics and kindred subjects are not sciences, but are on the way to become sciences.

Thomas Kuhn later provided a more precise description, protoscience as a field that generates testable conclusions, faces "incessant criticism and continually strive for a fresh start," but currently, like art and philosophy, appears to have failed to progress in a way similar to the progress seen in the established sciences. He applies protoscience to the fields of natural philosophy, medicine and the crafts in the past that ultimately became established sciences. Philosophers later developed more precise criteria to identify protoscience using the cognitive field concept.

The historian Scott Hendrix argued that the English word "science" as it is used by 21st century English speakers means modern science and that the use of the word to describe pre-modern scholars is misleading. "[E]ven an astute reader is prompted to classify intellectual exercises of the past as 'scientific'...based upon how closely those activities appear to mirror the activities of a modern scientist." Noting that natural philosophy was a far more neutral term than "science", Hendrix recommended that term be used instead when discussing pre-modern scholars of the natural world. "[T]here are sound reasons for a return to the use of the term natural philosophy that, for all its imprecision, reveals rather than imposes meaning on the past."

== Thought collective ==
This material is from Ludwik Fleck § Thought collective

Thomas Kuhn later discovered that Fleck 1935 had voiced concepts that predated Kuhn's own work. That is, Fleck wrote that the development of truth in scientific research was an unattainable ideal as different researchers were locked into thought collectives (or thought-styles). This means "that a pure and direct observation cannot exist: in the act of perceiving objects the observer, i.e. the epistemological subject, is always influenced by the epoch and the environment to which he belongs, that is by what Fleck calls the thought style". Thought style throughout Fleck's work is closely associated with representational style. A "fact" was a relative value, expressed in the language or symbolism of the thought collective in which it belonged, and subject to the social and temporal structure of this collective. He argued, however, that within the active cultural style of a thought collective, knowledge claims or facts were constrained by passive elements arising from the observations and experience of the natural world. This passive resistance of natural experience represented within the stylized means of the thought collective could be verified by anyone adhering to the culture of the thought collective, and thus facts could be agreed upon within any particular thought style. Thus while a fact may be verifiable within its own collective, it may be unverifiable in others. He felt that the development of scientific facts and concepts was not unidirectional and does not consist of just accumulating new pieces of information, but at times required changing older concepts, methods of observations, and forms of representation. This changing of prior knowledge is difficult because a collective attains over time a specific way of investigating, bringing with it a blindness to alternative ways of observing and conceptualization. Change was especially possible when members of two thought collectives met and cooperated in observing, formulating hypothesis and ideas. He strongly advocated comparative epistemology. He also notes some features of the culture of modern natural sciences that recognize provisionality and evolution of knowledge along the value of pursuit of passive resistances. This approach anticipated later developments in social constructionism, and especially the development of critical science and technology studies.

== Conceptual framework ==
=== Cognitive field ===
Philosophers describe protoscience using the cognitive field concept. In every society, there are fields of knowledge (cognitive fields). The cognitive field consists of a community of individuals within a society with a domain of inquiry, a philosophical worldview, logical/mathematical tools, specific background knowledge from neighboring fields, a set of problems investigated, accumulated knowledge from the community, aims and methods. Cognitive fields are either belief fields or research fields. A cognitive research field invariably changes over time due to research; research fields include natural sciences, applied sciences, mathematics, technology, medicine, jurisprudence, social sciences and the humanities. A belief field (faith field) is "a cognitive field which either does not change at all or changes due to factors other than research (such as economic interest, political or religious pressure, or brute violence)." Belief fields include political ideology, religion, pseudodoctrines and pseudoscience.

=== Science field ===
A science field is a research field that satisfies 12 conditions: 1) all components of the science field invariably change over time from research in the field, especially logical/mathematical tools and specific background/presuppositions from other fields; 2) the research community has special training, "hold strong information links", initiates or continues the "tradition of inquiry"; 3) researchers have autonomy to pursue research and receive support from the host society; 4) the researchers worldview is the real world as contains "lawfully changing concrete" objects, an adequate view of the scientific method, a vision of organized science achieving truthfull descriptions and explanations, ethical principles for conducting research, and the free search for truthful, deep and systematic understanding; 5) up-to-date logical/mathematical tools precisely determine and process information; 6) the domain of research are real objects/entities; 7) specific background knowledge is up-to-date, confirmed data, hypotheses and theories from relevant neighboring fields; 8) the set of problems investigated are from the domain of inquiry or within the research field; 9) the accumulated knowledge includes worldview-compatible, up-to-date testworthy/testable theories, hypotheses and data, and special knowledge previously accumlated in the research field; 10) the aims are find and apply laws and theories in the domain of inquiry, systemize acquired knowledge, generalized information into theories, and improve research methods; 11) appropriate scientific methods are "subject to test, correction and justification"; 12) the research field is connected with a wider research field with similar capable researchers capable of "scientific inference, action and discussion", similar hosting society, a domain of inquiry containing the domain of inquiry of the narrower field, and shared worldview, logical/mathematical tools, background knowledge, accumulated knowledge, aims and methods.

=== Protoscience ===
Philosophers define protoscience as an undeveloped science field, undeveloped meaning an incomplete or approximate science field. Mario Bunge defined a protoscience as a research field that approximately satisfies a similar set of the 12 science conditions. A protoscience that is evolving to ultimately satisfy all 12 conditions is an emerging or developing science. Bunge states, "The difference between protoscience and pseudoscience parallels that between error and deception." A protoscience may not survive or evolve to a science or pseudoscience. Kuhn was skeptical about any remedy that would reliably transform a protoscience to a science stating, "I claim no therapy to assist the transformation of a proto-science to a science, nor do I suppose anything of this sort is to be had."

Raimo Tuomela defined a protoscience as a research field that satisfies 9 of the 12 science conditions; a protoscience fails to satisfy the up-to-date conditions for logic/mathematical tools, specific background knowledge from neighboring fields, and accumulated knowledge (5, 7, 9), and there is reason to believe the protoscience will ultimately satisfy all 12 conditions. Protosciences and belief fields are both non-science fields, but only a protoscience can become a science field. Tuomela emphasizes that the cognitive field concept refers to "ideal types" and there may be some persons within a science field with non-scientific "attitudes, thinking and actions"; therefore, it may be better to apply scientific and non-scientific to "attitudes, thinking and actions" rather than directly to cognitive fields.

== Developmental stages of science ==
Bunge stated that protoscience may occur as the second stage of a five-stage process in the development of science. Each stage has a theoretical and empirical aspect:

1. Prescience has unchecked speculation theory and unchecked data.
2. Protoscience has hypotheses without theory accompanied by observation and occasional measurement, but no experiment.
3. Deuteroscience has hypotheses formulated mathematically without theory accompanied by systematic measurement, and experiment on perceptible traits of perceptible objects.
4. Tritoscience has mathematical models accompanied by systematic measurements and experiments on perceptible and imperceptible traits of perceptible and imperceptible objects.
5. Tetartoscience has mathematical models and comprehensive theories accompanied by precise systematic measurements and experiments on perceptible and imperceptible traits of perceptible and imperceptible objects.

== Origin of protoscience ==
Protoscience may arise from the philosophical inquiry that anticipates science. Philosophers anticipated the development of astronomy, atomic theory, evolution and linguistics. The Greek philosopher Anaximander (610–546 BC) viewed the earth as a non-moving free-floating cylinder in space. The atomist doctrine of Democritus (460–370 BC) to Epicurus (341–270 BC) was that objects were composed of non-visible small particles. Anaximander had anticipated that humans may have developed from more primitive organisms. Wittgenstein's study of language preceded the linguistic studies of J. L. Austin and John Searle. Popper describes how scientific theory arises from myths such as atomism and the corpuscular theory of light. Popper states that the Copernican system was "inspired by a Neo-Platonic worship of the light of the Sun who had to occupy the center because of his nobility", leading to "testable components" that ultimately became "fruitful and important."

Some scholars use the term "primitive protoscience" to describe ancient myths that help explain natural phenomena at a time prior to the development of the scientific method.

== Protoscience examples ==
=== Physical science ===
- Ancient astronomical protoscience was recorded as astronomical images and records inscribed on stones, bones and cave walls.
- Luigi Ferdinando Marsili (1658–1730) contributed to protoscience oceanography, describing the ocean currents of the Bosporus and physical oceanography, and Benjamin Franklin contributed by identifying the currents of the Gulf Stream.
- Philosophers consider physics before Galileo and Huygens, chemistry before Lavoisier, medicine before Virchow and Bernard, electricity before the mid-eighteenth century, and the study of heredity and phylogeny before the mid-nineteenth century as protosciences that eventually became established science.
- Prior to 1905, leading scientists, Ostwald and Mach, viewed atomic and molecular-kinetic theory as a protoscience, a theory indirectly supported by chemistry and statistical thermodynamics; however, Einstein's theory of Brownian motion, and Perrin's experimental verification led to widespread acceptance of atomic and molecular-kinetic theory as established science.
- The early stage of plate tectonics, beginning with Wegener's theory of continental drift, was a protoscience until experimental research confirmed the theory many years later. The initial widespread rejection of Wegener's theory is an example of the importance of not dismissing a protoscience.

=== Psychology ===
Critics state that psychology is a protoscience because some practices occur that prevent falsification of research hypotheses. Folk psychology and coaching psychology are protosciences.

=== Medicine ===
The use of scientifically invalid biomarkers to identify adverse outcomes is a protoscience practice in medicine. The process for reporting adverse medical events is a protoscience because it relies on uncorroborated data and unsystematic methods.

=== Technology ===
Hatleback describes cybersecurity as a protoscience that lacks transparency in experimentation, scientific laws, and sound experimental design in some cases; however cybersecurity has the potential to become a science.

== See also ==
- History of science
- Hypothesis
- Methodical culturalism
- Natural philosophy
- Obsolete scientific theories
- Pathological science
- Pseudoscience
