= Scientific method =

Interplay between observation, experiment, and theory in science

The scientific method is an empirical method for acquiring knowledge through careful observation, rigorous skepticism, hypothesis testing, and experimental validation. Developed from ancient and medieval practices, it acknowledges that cognitive assumptions can distort the interpretation of the observation. The scientific method has characterized science since at least the 17th century. Scientific inquiry includes creating a testable hypothesis through inductive reasoning, testing it through experiments and statistical analysis, and adjusting or discarding the hypothesis based on the results.

Although procedures vary across fields, the underlying process is often similar. In more detail: the scientific method involves making conjectures (hypothetical explanations), predicting the logical consequences of hypothesis, then carrying out experiments or empirical observations based on those predictions. A hypothesis is a conjecture based on knowledge obtained while seeking answers to the question. Hypotheses can be very specific or broad but must be falsifiable, implying that it is possible to identify a possible outcome of an experiment or observation that conflicts with predictions deduced from the hypothesis; otherwise, the hypothesis cannot be meaningfully tested.

While the scientific method is often presented as a fixed sequence of steps, it actually represents a set of general principles. Not all steps take place in every scientific inquiry (nor to the same degree), and they are not always in the same order. Numerous discoveries have not followed the textbook model of the scientific method, and, in some cases, chance has played a role.

== History ==
The history of the scientific method is different from the history of science itself. The development of rules for scientific reasoning has not been straightforward; the scientific method has been the subject of intense and recurring debate throughout the history of science, and eminent natural philosophers and scientists have argued for the primacy of various approaches to establishing scientific knowledge.

Different early expressions of empiricism and the scientific method can be found throughout history, for instance with the ancient Stoics, Aristotle, Epicurus, Alhazen, (Note: Twenty-three hundred years ago, Aristotle proposed that a vacuum did not exist in nature; thirteen hundred years later, Alhazen disproved Aristotle's hypothesis, using experiments on refraction, thus deducing the existence of outer space.) (Note: Book of Optics (circa 1027) After anatomical investigation of the human eye, and an exhaustive study of human visual perception, Alhacen characterizes the first postulate of Euclid's Optics as 'superfluous and useless' (Book I, [6.54] —thereby overturning Euclid's, Ptolemy's, and Galen's emission theory of vision, using logic and deduction from experiment. He showed Euclid's first postulate of Optics to be hypothetical only, and fails to account for his experiments.), and deduces that light must enter the eye, in order for us to see. He describes the camera obscura as part of this investigation.) (Note: Alhazen argued the importance of forming questions and subsequently testing them: "How does light travel through transparent bodies? Light travels through transparent bodies in straight lines only... We have explained this exhaustively in our Book of Optics. (Note: Book of Optics Book Seven, Chapter Two [2.1] p.220: — light travels through transparent bodies, such as air, water, glass, transparent stones, in straight lines. "Indeed, this is observable by means of experiment".) But let us now mention something to prove this convincingly: the fact that light travels in straight lines is clearly observed in the lights which enter into dark rooms through holes.... [T]he entering light will be clearly observable in the dust which fills the air.: He demonstrated his conjecture that "light travels through transparent bodies in straight lines only" by placing a straight stick or a taut thread next to the light beam, as quoted in Sambursky (1975), p. 136 to prove that light travels in a straight line.; David Hockney cites Alhazen several times as the likely source for the portraiture technique using the camera obscura, which Hockney rediscovered with the aid of an optical suggestion from Charles M. Falco. Kitab al-Manazir, which is Alhazen's Book of Optics, at that time denoted Opticae Thesaurus, Alhazen Arabis, was translated from Arabic into Latin for European use as early as 1270. Hockney cites Friedrich Risner's 1572 Basle edition of Opticae Thesaurus. Hockney quotes Alhazen as the first clear description of the camera obscura.) (Note: Sabra (2007) recounts how Kamāl al-Dīn al-Fārisī came by his manuscript copy of Alhacen's Book of Optics, which by then was some two centuries old: al-Fārisī's project was to write an advanced optics treatise, but he could not understand optical refraction using his best resources. His mentor, Qutb al-Din al-Shirazi recalled having seen Alhacen's manuscript as a youth, and arranged to get al-Fārisī a copy "from a distant country". al-Fārisī is now remembered for his Commentary on Alhacen's Book of Optics in which he found a satisfactory explanation for the phenomenon of the rainbow: light rays from the sun are doubly refracted within the raindrops in the air, back to the observer. Refraction of the colors from the sun's light then forms the spread of colors in the rainbow.) Avicenna, Al-Biruni, Roger Bacon (Note: His assertions in the Opus Majus that "theories supplied by reason should be verified by sensory data, aided by instruments, and corroborated by trustworthy witnesses" were (and still are) considered "one of the first important formulations of the scientific method on record".), and William of Ockham.

In the Scientific Revolution of the 16th and 17th centuries, some of the most important developments were the furthering of empiricism by Francis Bacon and Robert Hooke, the rationalist approach described by René Descartes, and inductivism, which was further brought to particular prominence by scientists such as Isaac Newton and those who followed him. Newton postulated four principles which form the basis of modern science, and refined the scientific method. Experiments were advocated by Francis Bacon and performed by Giambattista della Porta, Johannes Kepler, (Note: Many generations of naked eye astronomers even before Tycho Brahe's time, centuries before Kepler, were able to identify astronomical bodies. Among them: Kidinnu, Hipparchus, Claudius Ptolemy, the astronomers in Chaldea, Sumeria, India, China, and the Americas, compiled data and recorded it, in the Almagest, in the Toledan Tables, in the Alphonsine tables, in the Rudolphine tables, etc. The astronomical tables were specific to the observatory and required mathematical adjustment to account for the position of the observatory on Earth.) (Note: Kepler, Johannes (1604) Ad Vitellionem paralipomena, quibus astronomiae pars opticae traditur (Supplements to Witelo, in which the optical part of astronomy is treated) (Note: The full title translation is from Voelkel (2001), p. 60.) as cited in Smith, A. Mark (June 2004). "What Is the History of Medieval Optics Really about?". Proceedings of the American Philosophical Society. 148 (2): 180–194. JSTOR 1558283. PMID 15338543.) (Note: Kepler was driven to this experiment after observing the partial solar eclipse at Graz, July 10, 1600. He used Tycho Brahe's method of observation, which was to project the image of the Sun on a piece of paper through a pinhole aperture, instead of looking directly at the Sun. He disagreed with Brahe's conclusion that total eclipses of the Sun were impossible because there were historical accounts of total eclipses. Instead, he deduced that the size of the aperture controls the sharpness of the projected image (the larger the aperture, the more accurate the image – this fact is now fundamental for optical system design). Voelkel (2001), p. 61, notes that Kepler's 1604 experiments produced the first correct account of vision and the eye, because he realized he could not accurately write about astronomical observation by ignoring the eye. Smith (2004), p. 192 recounts how Kepler used Giambattista della Porta's water-filled glass spheres to model the eye, and using an aperture to represent the entrance pupil of the eye, showed that the entire scene at the entrance pupil-focused on a single point of the rear of the glass sphere (representing the retina of the eye). This completed Kepler's investigation of the optical train, as it satisfied his application to astronomy.) and Galileo Galilei. (Note: ...an experimental approach was advocated by Galileo in 1638 with the publication of Two New Sciences.) There was particular development aided by theoretical works by the skeptic Francisco Sanches, by idealists as well as empiricists John Locke, George Berkeley, and David Hume. (Note: Sanches and Locke were both physicians. By his training in Rome and France, Sanches sought a method of science beyond that of the Scholastic Aristotelian school. Botanical gardens were added to the universities in Sanches' time to aid medical training before the 1600s. See Locke (1689) An Essay Concerning Human Understanding Berkeley served as foil to the materialist System of the World of Newton; Berkeley emphasizes that scientist should seek 'reduction to regularity'. Atherton (ed.) 1999 selects Locke, Berkeley, and Hume as part of the empiricist school.) C. S. Peirce formulated the hypothetico-deductive model in the 20th century, and the model has undergone significant revision since.

The term scientific method emerged in the 19th century, as a result of significant institutional development of science, and terminologies establishing clear boundaries between science and non-science, such as scientist and pseudoscience. Throughout the 1830s and 1850s, when Baconianism was popular, naturalists like William Whewell, John Herschel, and John Stuart Mill engaged in debates over "induction" and "facts," and were focused on how to generate knowledge. In the late 19th and early 20th centuries, a debate over realism vs. antirealism was conducted as powerful scientific theories extended beyond the realm of the observable.

=== Modern use and critical thought ===
The term scientific method came into popular use in the twentieth century; Dewey's 1910 book, How We Think, inspired popular guidelines. It appeared in dictionaries and science textbooks, although there was little consensus on its meaning. Although there was growth through the middle of the twentieth century, (Note: On Dewey's Laboratory school in 1902: Cowles 2020 notes that Dewey regarded the Lab school as a collaboration between teachers and students. The five-step exposition was taken as mandatory, rather than descriptive. Dismayed by the Procrustean interpretation, Dewey attempted to tone down his five-step scheme by re-naming the steps to phases. The edit was ignored.) by the 1960s and 1970s numerous influential philosophers of science such as Thomas Kuhn and Paul Feyerabend had questioned the universality of the "scientific method", and largely replaced the notion of science as a homogeneous and universal method with that of it being a heterogeneous and local practice. In particular, Paul Feyerabend, in the 1975 first edition of his book Against Method, argued against there being any universal rules of science; Karl Popper, (Note: Popper, in his 1963 publication of Conjectures and Refutations argued that merely Trial and Error can stand to be called a 'universal method'.) and Gauch 2003, disagreed with Feyerabend's claim.

Later stances include physicist Lee Smolin's 2013 essay "There Is No Scientific Method", in which he espouses two ethical principles, (Note: Lee Smolin, in his 2013 essay "There Is No Scientific Method", espouses two ethical principles. Firstly: "we agree to tell the truth and we agree to be governed by rational argument from public evidence". And secondly, that ..."when the evidence is not sufficient to decide from rational argument, whether one point of view is right or another point of view is right, we agree to encourage competition and diversification". Thus echoing Popper (1963), p. viii) and historian of science Daniel Thurs' chapter in the 2015 book Newton's Apple and Other Myths about Science, which concluded that the scientific method is a myth or, at best, an idealization. As myths are beliefs, they are subject to the narrative fallacy, as pointed out by Taleb. Philosophers Robert Nola and Howard Sankey, in their 2007 book Theories of Scientific Method, said that debates over the scientific method continue, and argued that Feyerabend, despite the title of Against Method, accepted certain rules of method and attempted to justify those rules with a meta methodology. Staddon (2017) argues it is a mistake to try following rules in the absence of an algorithmic scientific method; in that case, "science is best understood through examples". But algorithmic methods, such as disproof of existing theory by experiment have been used since Alhacen (1027) and his Book of Optics, and Galileo (1638) and his Two New Sciences, and The Assayer, which still stand as scientific method.

== Elements of inquiry ==
=== Overview ===
The scientific method is often represented as an ongoing process. This diagram represents one variant, and there are many others.

The scientific method is the process by which science is carried out. As in other areas of inquiry, science (through the scientific method) can build on previous knowledge, and unify understanding of its studied topics over time. (Note: The topics of study, as expressed in the vocabulary of its scientists, are approached by a "single unified method". The topics are unified by its predicates, in a system of expressions. The unification process was formalized by Jacques Herbrand in 1930.) Historically, the development of the scientific method was critical to the Scientific Revolution.

The overall process involves making conjectures (hypotheses), predicting their logical consequences, then carrying out experiments based on those predictions to determine whether the original conjecture was correct. However, there are difficulties in a formulaic statement of method. The scientific method represents general principles rather than a fixed sequence, not all steps occur in every inquiry, nor always in the same order. It requires intelligence, imagination, and creativity rather than rigid adherence to procedure.

==== Factors of scientific inquiry ====
There are different ways of outlining the basic method used for scientific inquiry. The scientific community and philosophers of science generally agree on the following classification of method components. These methodological elements and organization of procedures tend to be more characteristic of experimental sciences than social sciences. Nonetheless, the cycle of formulating hypotheses, testing and analyzing the results, and formulating new hypotheses, will resemble the cycle described below.The scientific method is an iterative, cyclical process through which information is continually revised. It is generally recognized to develop advances in knowledge through the following elements, in varying combinations or contributions:

- Characterizations (observations, definitions, and measurements of the subject of inquiry)
- Hypotheses (theoretical, hypothetical explanations of observations and measurements of the subject)
- Predictions (inductive and deductive reasoning from the hypothesis or theory)
- Experiments (tests of all of the above)

Each element of the scientific method is subject to peer review for possible mistakes. These activities do not describe all that scientists do but apply mostly to experimental sciences (e.g., physics, chemistry, biology, and psychology). The elements above are often taught in the educational system as "the scientific method". (Note: In the inquiry-based education paradigm, the stage of "characterization, observation, definition, ..." is more briefly summed up under the rubric of a Question. The question at some stage might be as basic as the 5Ws, or is this answer true?, or who else might know this?, or can I ask them?, and so forth. The questions of the inquirer spiral until the goal is reached.)

The scientific method is not a single recipe: it requires intelligence, imagination, and creativity. In this sense, it is not a mindless set of standards and procedures to follow but is rather an ongoing cycle, constantly developing more useful, accurate, and comprehensive models and methods. For example, when Einstein developed the Special and General Theories of Relativity, he did not in any way refute or discount Newton's Principia. On the contrary, if the astronomically massive, the feather-light, and the extremely fast are removed from Einstein's theories – all phenomena Newton could not have observed – Newton's equations are what remain. Einstein's theories are expansions and refinements of Newton's theories and, thus, increase confidence in Newton's work.

An iterative, pragmatic scheme of the four points above is sometimes offered as a guideline for proceeding:

1. Define a question
2. Gather information and resources (observe)
3. Form an explanatory hypothesis
4. Test the hypothesis by performing an experiment and collecting data in a reproducible manner
5. Analyze the data
6. Interpret the data and draw conclusions that serve as a starting point for a new hypothesis
7. Publish results
8. Retest (frequently done by other scientists)

The iterative cycle inherent in this step-by-step method goes from point 3 to 6 and back to 3 again.

While this schema outlines a typical hypothesis/testing method, many philosophers, historians, and sociologists of science, including Paul Feyerabend, (Note: "no opinion, however absurd and incredible, can be imagined, which has not been maintained by some of the philosophers". —Descartes) claim that such descriptions of scientific method have little relation to the ways that science is actually practiced.

=== Characterizations ===
The basic elements of the scientific method are illustrated by the following example (which occurred from 1944 to 1953) from the discovery of the structure of DNA (marked with and indented).

In 1950, it was known that genetic inheritance had a mathematical description, starting with the studies of Gregor Mendel, and that DNA contained genetic information (Oswald Avery's transforming principle). But the mechanism of storing genetic information (i.e., genes) in DNA was unclear. Researchers in Bragg's laboratory at Cambridge University made X-ray diffraction pictures of various molecules, starting with crystals of salt, and proceeding to more complicated substances. Using clues painstakingly assembled over decades, beginning with its chemical composition, it was determined that it should be possible to characterize the physical structure of DNA, and the X-ray images would be the vehicle.

The scientific method depends upon increasingly sophisticated characterizations of the subjects of investigation. (The subjects can also be called unsolved problems or the unknowns.) For example, Benjamin Franklin conjectured, correctly, that St. Elmo's fire was electrical in nature, but it has taken a long series of experiments and theoretical changes to establish this. While seeking the pertinent properties of the subjects, careful thought may also entail some definitions and observations; these observations often demand careful measurements and/or counting that can take the form of expansive empirical research.

A scientific question can refer to the explanation of a specific observation, as in "Why is the sky blue?" but can also be open-ended, as in "How can I design a drug to cure this particular disease?" This stage frequently involves finding and evaluating evidence from previous experiments, personal scientific observations or assertions, as well as the work of other scientists. If the answer is already known, a different question that builds on the evidence can be posed. When applying the scientific method to research, determining a good question can be very difficult and it will affect the outcome of the investigation.

The systematic, careful collection of measurements or counts of relevant quantities is often the critical difference between pseudo-sciences, such as alchemy, and science, such as chemistry or biology. Scientific measurements are usually tabulated, graphed, or mapped, and statistical manipulations, such as correlation and regression, performed on them. The measurements might be made in a controlled setting, such as a laboratory, or made on more or less inaccessible or unmanipulatable objects such as stars or human populations. The measurements often require specialized scientific instruments such as thermometers, spectroscopes, particle accelerators, or voltmeters, and the progress of a scientific field is usually intimately tied to their invention and improvement.

I am not accustomed to saying anything with certainty after only one or two observations.

— Andreas Vesalius (1546)

==== Definition ====
The scientific definition of a term sometimes differs substantially from its natural language usage. For example, mass and weight overlap in meaning in common discourse, but have distinct meanings in mechanics. Scientific quantities are often characterized by their units of measure which can later be described in terms of conventional physical units when communicating the work.

New theories are sometimes developed after realizing certain terms have not previously been sufficiently clearly defined. For example, Albert Einstein's first paper on relativity begins by defining simultaneity and the means for determining length. These ideas were skipped over by Isaac Newton with, "I do not define time, space, place and motion, as being well known to all." Einstein's paper then demonstrates that they (viz., absolute time and length independent of motion) were approximations. Francis Crick cautions us that when characterizing a subject, however, it can be premature to define something when it remains ill-understood. In Crick's study of consciousness, he actually found it easier to study awareness in the visual system, rather than to study free will, for example. His cautionary example was the gene; the gene was much more poorly understood before Watson and Crick's pioneering discovery of the structure of DNA; it would have been counterproductive to spend much time on the definition of the gene, before them.

=== Hypothesis development ===
Linus Pauling proposed that DNA might be a triple helix. This hypothesis was also considered by Francis Crick and James D. Watson but discarded. When Watson and Crick learned of Pauling's hypothesis, they understood from existing data that Pauling was wrong. and that Pauling would soon admit his difficulties with that structure.

A hypothesis is a suggested explanation of a phenomenon, or alternately a reasoned proposal suggesting a possible correlation between or among a set of phenomena. Normally, hypotheses have the form of a mathematical model. Sometimes, but not always, they can also be formulated as existential statements, stating that some particular instance of the phenomenon being studied has some characteristic and causal explanations, which have the general form of universal statements, stating that every instance of the phenomenon has a particular characteristic.

Scientists are free to use whatever resources they have – their own creativity, ideas from other fields, inductive reasoning, Bayesian inference, and so on – to imagine possible explanations for a phenomenon under study. Albert Einstein once observed that "there is no logical bridge between phenomena and their theoretical principles." (Note: "A leap is involved in all thinking" —John Dewey) Charles Sanders Peirce, borrowing a page from Aristotle (Prior Analytics, 2.25) described the incipient stages of inquiry, instigated by the "irritation of doubt" to venture a plausible guess, as abductive reasoning. The history of science is filled with stories of scientists claiming a "flash of inspiration", or a hunch, which then motivated them to look for evidence to support or refute their idea. Michael Polanyi made such creativity the centerpiece of his discussion of methodology.

William Glen observes that

the success of a hypothesis, or its service to science, lies not simply in its perceived "truth", or power to displace, subsume or reduce a predecessor idea, but perhaps more in its ability to stimulate the research that will illuminate ... bald suppositions and areas of vagueness.

— William Glen, The Mass-Extinction Debates

In general, scientists tend to look for theories that are "elegant" or "beautiful". Scientists often use these terms to refer to a theory that is following the known facts but is nevertheless relatively simple and easy to handle. Occam's Razor serves as a rule of thumb for choosing the most desirable amongst a group of equally explanatory hypotheses.

To minimize the confirmation bias that results from entertaining a single hypothesis, strong inference emphasizes the need for entertaining multiple alternative hypotheses, and avoiding artifacts.

=== Predictions from the hypothesis ===
James D. Watson, Francis Crick, and others hypothesized that DNA had a helical structure. This implied that DNA's X-ray diffraction pattern would be 'x shaped'. This prediction followed from the work of Cochran, Crick and Vand (and independently by Stokes). The Cochran-Crick-Vand-Stokes theorem provided a mathematical explanation for the empirical observation that diffraction from helical structures produces x-shaped patterns. In their first paper, Watson and Crick also noted that the double helix structure they proposed provided a simple mechanism for DNA replication, writing, "It has not escaped our notice that the specific pairing we have postulated immediately suggests a possible copying mechanism for the genetic material".

Any useful hypothesis will enable predictions, by reasoning including deductive reasoning. (Note: From the hypothesis, deduce valid forms using modus ponens, or using modus tollens. Avoid invalid forms such as affirming the consequent.) It might predict the outcome of an experiment in a laboratory setting or the observation of a phenomenon in nature. The prediction can also be statistical and deal only with probabilities.

It is essential that the outcome of testing such a prediction be currently unknown. Only in this case does a successful outcome increase the probability that the hypothesis is true. If the outcome is already known, it is called a consequence and should have already been considered while formulating the hypothesis.

If the predictions are not accessible by observation or experience, the hypothesis is not yet testable and so will remain to that extent unscientific in a strict sense. A new technology or theory might make the necessary experiments feasible. For example, while a hypothesis on the existence of other intelligent species may be convincing with scientifically based speculation, no known experiment can test this hypothesis. Therefore, science itself can have little to say about the possibility. In the future, a new technique may allow for an experimental test and the speculation would then become part of accepted science.

For example, Einstein's theory of general relativity makes several specific predictions about the observable structure of spacetime, such as that light bends in a gravitational field, and that the amount of bending depends in a precise way on the strength of that gravitational field. Arthur Eddington's observations made during a 1919 solar eclipse supported General Relativity rather than Newtonian gravitation.

=== Experiments ===
Watson and Crick showed an initial (and incorrect) proposal for the structure of DNA to a team from King's College London – Rosalind Franklin, Maurice Wilkins, and Raymond Gosling. Franklin immediately spotted the flaws which concerned the water content. Later Watson saw Franklin's photo 51, a detailed X-ray diffraction image, which showed an X-shape and was able to confirm the structure was helical. (Note: The goal shifts: after observing the x-ray diffraction pattern of DNA, and as time was of the essence, Watson and Crick realize that fastest way to discover DNA's structure was not by mathematical analysis, but by building physical models.)

Once predictions are made, they can be sought by experiments. If the test results contradict the predictions, the hypotheses which entailed them are called into question and become less tenable. Sometimes the experiments are conducted incorrectly or are not very well designed when compared to a crucial experiment. If the experimental results confirm the predictions, then the hypotheses are considered more likely to be correct, but might still be wrong and continue to be subject to further testing. The experimental control is a technique for dealing with observational error. This technique uses the contrast between multiple samples, or observations, or populations, under differing conditions, to see what varies or what remains the same. We vary the conditions for the acts of measurement, to help isolate what has changed. Mill's canons can then help us figure out what the important factor is. Factor analysis is one technique for discovering the important factor in an effect.

Depending on the predictions, the experiments can have different shapes. It could be a classical experiment in a laboratory setting, a double-blind study or an archaeological excavation. Even taking a plane from New York to Paris is an experiment that tests the aerodynamical hypotheses used for constructing the plane.

These institutions thereby reduce the research function to a cost/benefit, which is expressed as money, and the time and attention of the researchers to be expended, in exchange for a report to their constituents. Current large instruments, such as CERN's Large Hadron Collider (LHC), or LIGO, or the National Ignition Facility (NIF), or the International Space Station (ISS), or the James Webb Space Telescope (JWST), entail expected costs of billions of dollars, and timeframes extending over decades. These kinds of institutions affect public policy, on a national or even international basis, and the researchers would require shared access to such machines and their adjunct infrastructure. (Note: The machinery of the mind can only transform knowledge, but never originate it, unless it be fed with facts of observation. —C.S. Peirce)

Scientists assume an attitude of openness and accountability on the part of those experimenting. Detailed record-keeping is essential, to aid in recording and reporting on the experimental results, and supports the effectiveness and integrity of the procedure. They will also assist in reproducing the experimental results, likely by others. Traces of this approach can be seen in the work of Hipparchus (190–120 BCE), when determining a value for the precession of the Earth, while controlled experiments can be seen in the works of al-Battani (853–929 CE) and Alhazen (965–1039 CE). (Note: Book of Optics Book II [3.52] to [3.66] Summary p.444 for Alhazen's experiments on color; pp.343—394 for his physiological experiments on the eye)

=== Communication and iteration ===
Watson and Crick then produced their model, using this information along with the previously known information about DNA's composition, especially Chargaff's rules of base pairing. After considerable fruitless experimentation, being discouraged by their superior from continuing, and numerous false starts, Watson and Crick were able to infer the essential structure of DNA by concrete modeling of the physical shapes of the nucleotides which comprise it. They were guided by the bond lengths which had been deduced by Linus Pauling and by Rosalind Franklin's X-ray diffraction images.

The scientific method is iterative. At any stage, it is possible to refine its accuracy and precision, so that some consideration will lead the scientist to repeat an earlier part of the process. Failure to develop an interesting hypothesis may lead a scientist to re-define the subject under consideration. Failure of a hypothesis to produce interesting and testable predictions may lead to reconsideration of the hypothesis or of the definition of the subject. Failure of an experiment to produce interesting results may lead a scientist to reconsider the experimental method, the hypothesis, or the definition of the subject.

This manner of iteration can span decades and sometimes centuries. Published papers can be built upon. For example: By 1027, Alhazen, based on his measurements of the refraction of light, was able to deduce that outer space was less dense than air, that is: "the body of the heavens is rarer than the body of air". In 1079 Ibn Mu'adh's Treatise On Twilight was able to infer that Earth's atmosphere was 50 miles thick, based on atmospheric refraction of the sun's rays. (Note: The Sun's rays are still visible at twilight in the morning and evening due to atmospheric refraction even when the depression angle of the sun is 18° below the horizon.)

This is why the scientific method is often represented as circular – new information leads to new characterisations, and the cycle of science continues. Measurements collected can be archived, passed onwards and used by others. Other scientists may start their own research and enter the process at any stage. They might adopt the characterization and formulate their own hypothesis, or they might adopt the hypothesis and deduce their own predictions. Often the experiment is not done by the person who made the prediction, and the characterization is based on experiments done by someone else. Published results of experiments can also serve as a hypothesis predicting their own reproducibility.

=== Confirmation ===
Science is a social enterprise, and scientific work tends to be accepted by the scientific community when it has been confirmed. Crucially, experimental and theoretical results must be reproduced by others within the scientific community. Researchers have given their lives for this vision; Georg Wilhelm Richmann was killed by ball lightning (1753) when attempting to replicate the 1752 kite-flying experiment of Benjamin Franklin.

If an experiment cannot be repeated to produce the same results, this implies that the original results might have been in error. As a result, it is common for a single experiment to be performed multiple times, especially when there are uncontrolled variables or other indications of experimental error. For significant or surprising results, other scientists may also attempt to replicate the results for themselves, especially if those results would be important to their own work. Replication has become a contentious issue in social and biomedical science where treatments are administered to groups of individuals. Typically an experimental group gets the treatment, such as a drug, and the control group gets a placebo. John Ioannidis in 2005 pointed out that the method being used has led to many findings that cannot be replicated.

Peer review—anonymous expert evaluation of research—assesses experimental soundness rather than certifying correctness. Some journals request that the experimenter provide lists of possible peer reviewers, especially if the field is highly specialized. Specialists review methodology and design; if approved (sometimes requiring additional experiments), the prestige of the journal where the work is published indicates perceived quality. (Note: In Two New Sciences, there are three 'reviewers': Simplicio, Sagredo, and Salviati, who serve as foil, antagonist, and protagonist. Galileo speaks for himself only briefly. But Einstein's 1905 papers were not peer-reviewed before their publication.)

Scientists typically are careful in recording their data, a requirement promoted by Ludwik Fleck (1896–1961) and others. Though not typically required, they might be requested to supply this data to other scientists who wish to replicate their original results (or parts of their original results), extending to the sharing of any experimental samples that may be difficult to obtain. To protect against bad science and fraudulent data, government research-granting agencies such as the National Science Foundation, and science journals, including Nature and Science, have a policy that researchers must archive their data and methods so that other researchers can test the data and methods and build on the research that has gone before. Scientific data archiving can be done at several national archives in the U.S. or the World Data Center.

== Foundational principles ==
=== Honesty, openness, and falsifiability ===
The unfettered principles of science are to strive for accuracy and the creed of honesty; openness already being a matter of degrees. Openness is restricted by the general rigour of scepticism. And of course the matter of non-science.

Smolin, in 2013, espoused ethical principles rather than giving any potentially limited definition of the rules of inquiry. His ideas stand in the context of the scale of data–driven and big science, which has seen increased importance of honesty and consequently reproducibility. His thought is that science is a community effort by those who have accreditation and are working within the community. He also warns against overzealous parsimony.

Popper previously took ethical principles even further, going as far as to ascribe value to theories only if they were falsifiable. Popper used the falsifiability criterion to demarcate a scientific theory from a theory like astrology: both "explain" observations, but the scientific theory takes the risk of making predictions that decide whether it is right or wrong:

"Those among us who are unwilling to expose their ideas to the hazard of refutation do not take part in the game of science."

— Karl Popper, The Logic of Scientific Discovery (2002 [1935])

=== Theory's interactions with observation ===
Science has limits. Those limits are usually deemed to be answers to questions that aren't in science's domain, such as faith. Science has other limits as well, as it seeks to make true statements about reality. The nature of truth and the discussion on how scientific statements relate to reality is best left to the article on the philosophy of science here. More immediately topical limitations show themselves in the observation of reality.

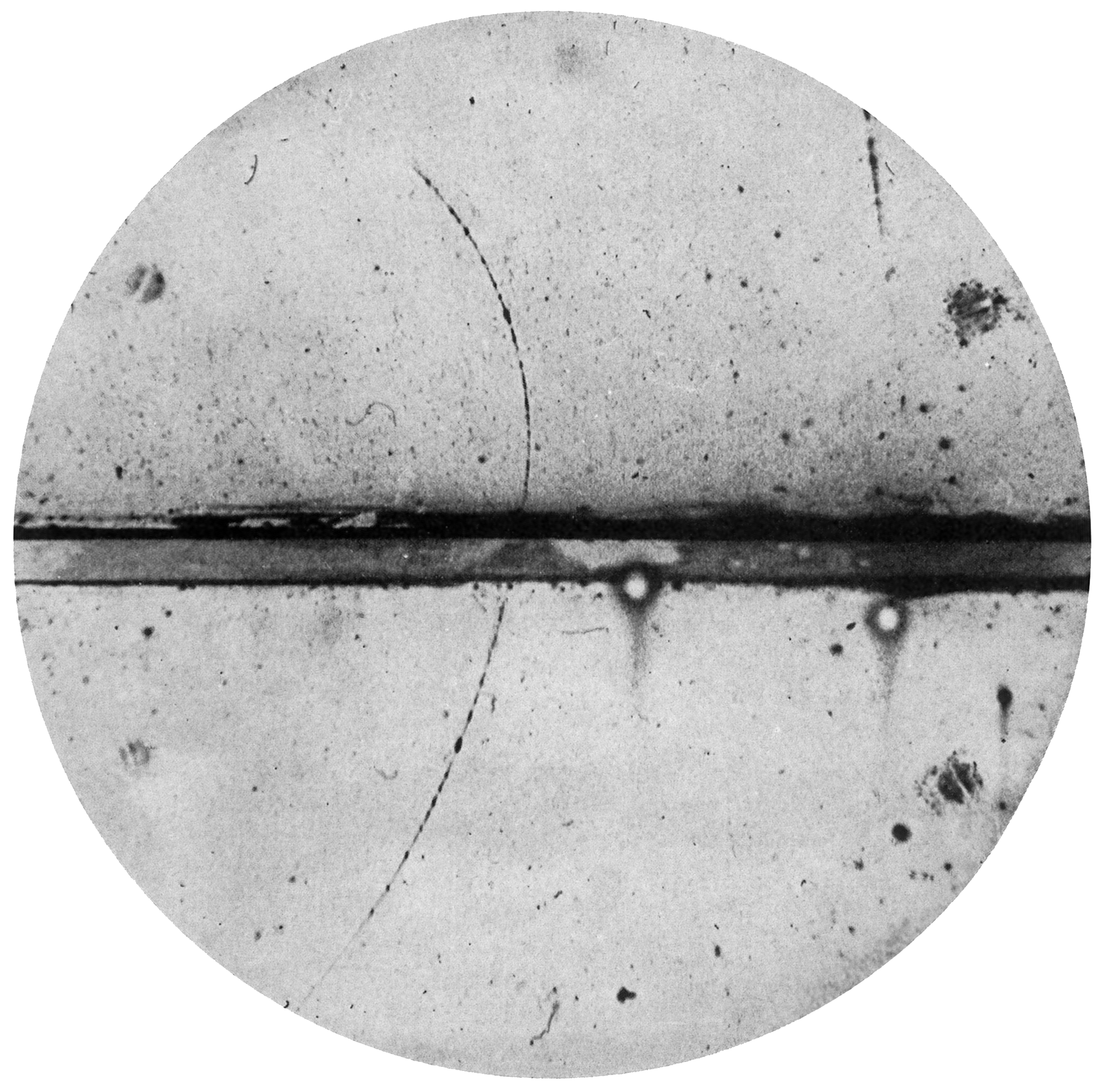
This cloud chamber photograph is the first observational evidence of positrons, 2 August 1932; interpretable only through prior theory.

It is the natural limitations of scientific inquiry that there is no pure observation as theory is required to interpret empirical data, and observation is therefore influenced by the observer's conceptual framework. As science is an unfinished project, this does lead to difficulties. Namely, that false conclusions are drawn, because of limited information.

An example here are the experiments of Kepler and Brahe, used by Hanson to illustrate the concept. Despite observing the same sunrise the two scientists came to different conclusions—their intersubjectivity leading to differing conclusions. Johannes Kepler used Tycho Brahe's method of observation, which was to project the image of the Sun on a piece of paper through a pinhole aperture, instead of looking directly at the Sun. He disagreed with Brahe's conclusion that total eclipses of the Sun were impossible because, contrary to Brahe, he knew that there were historical accounts of total eclipses. Instead, he deduced that the images taken would become more accurate, the larger the aperture—this fact is now fundamental for optical system design. Another historic example here is the discovery of Neptune, credited as being found via mathematics because previous observers didn't know what they were looking at.

=== Empiricism, rationalism, and more pragmatic views ===
Scientific endeavour can be characterised as the pursuit of truths about the natural world or as the elimination of doubt about the same. The former is the direct construction of explanations from empirical data and logic, the latter the reduction of potential explanations. (Note: "At the heart of science is an essential balance between two seemingly contradictory attitudes—an openness to new ideas, no matter how bizarre or counterintuitive, and the most ruthlessly skeptical scrutiny of all ideas, old and new. This is how deep truths are winnowed from deep nonsense." — Carl Sagan) It was established above how the interpretation of empirical data is theory-laden, so neither approach is trivial.

The ubiquitous element in the scientific method is empiricism, which holds that knowledge is created by a process involving observation; scientific theories generalize observations. This is in opposition to stringent forms of rationalism, which holds that knowledge is created by the human intellect; later clarified by Popper to be built on prior theory. The scientific method embodies the position that reason alone cannot solve a particular scientific problem; it unequivocally refutes claims that revelation, political or religious dogma, appeals to tradition, commonly held beliefs, common sense, or currently held theories pose the only possible means of demonstrating truth.

In 1877, C. S. Peirce characterized inquiry in general not as the pursuit of truth per se but as the struggle to move from irritating, inhibitory doubts born of surprises, disagreements, and the like, and to reach a secure belief, the belief being that on which one is prepared to act. His pragmatic views framed scientific inquiry as part of a broader spectrum and as spurred, like inquiry generally, by actual doubt, not mere verbal or "hyperbolic doubt", which he held to be fruitless. (Note: "What one does not in the least doubt one should not pretend to doubt; but a man should train himself to doubt," said Peirce in a brief intellectual autobiography. Peirce held that actual, genuine doubt originates externally, usually in surprise, but also that it is to be sought and cultivated, "provided only that it be the weighty and noble metal itself, and no counterfeit nor paper substitute".) This "hyperbolic doubt" Peirce argues against here is of course just another name for Cartesian doubt associated with René Descartes. It is a methodological route to certain knowledge by identifying what can't be doubted.

A strong formulation of the scientific method is not always aligned with a form of empiricism in which the empirical data is put forward in the form of experience or other abstracted forms of knowledge as in current scientific practice the use of scientific modelling and reliance on abstract typologies and theories is normally accepted. In 2010, Hawking suggested that physics' models of reality should simply be accepted where they prove to make useful predictions. He calls the concept model-dependent realism.

== Rationality ==
The following section will first explore beliefs and biases, and then get to the rational reasoning most associated with the sciences.

=== Beliefs and biases ===
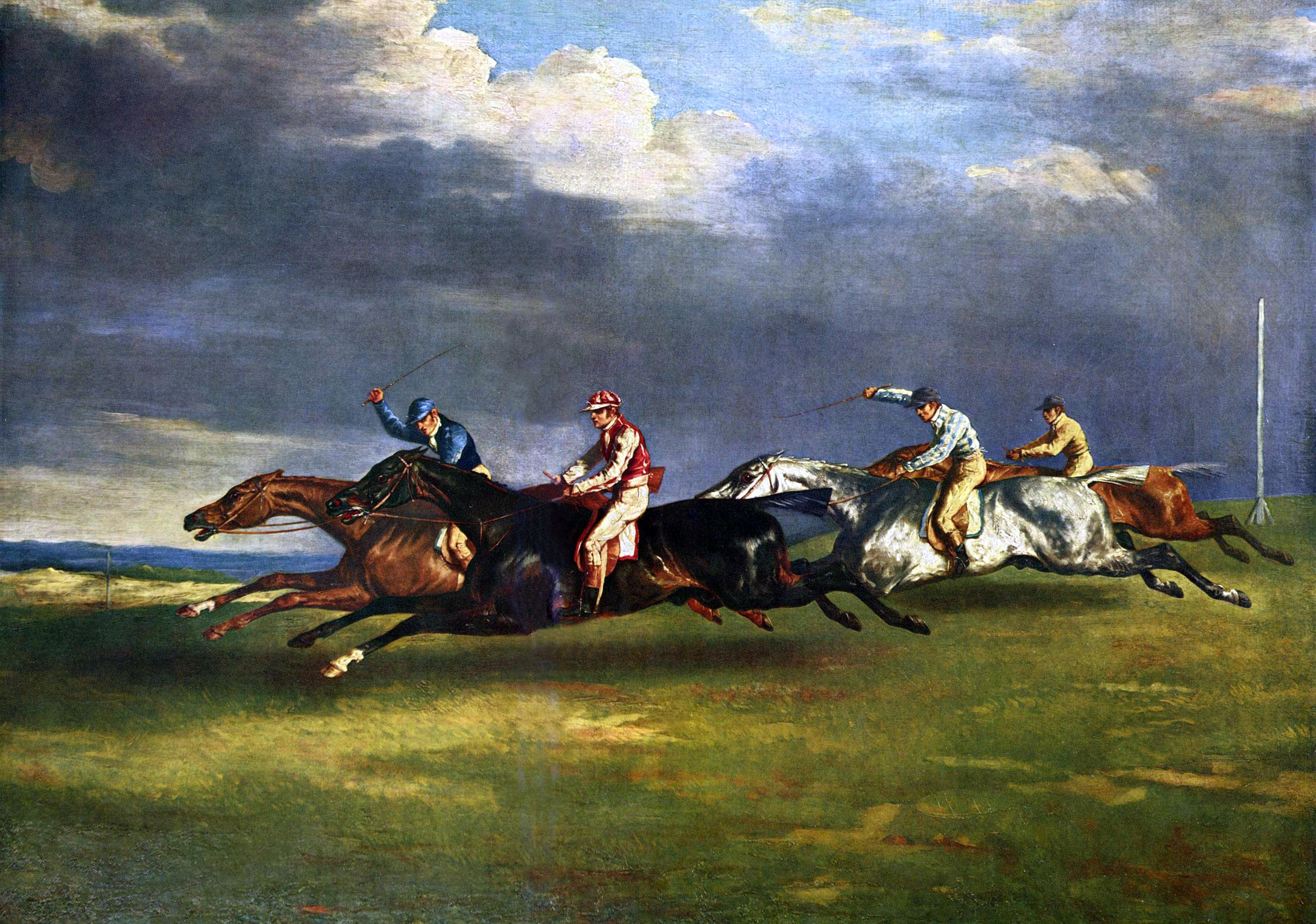
Flying gallop as shown by this painting (Théodore Géricault, 1821) is falsified; see below.

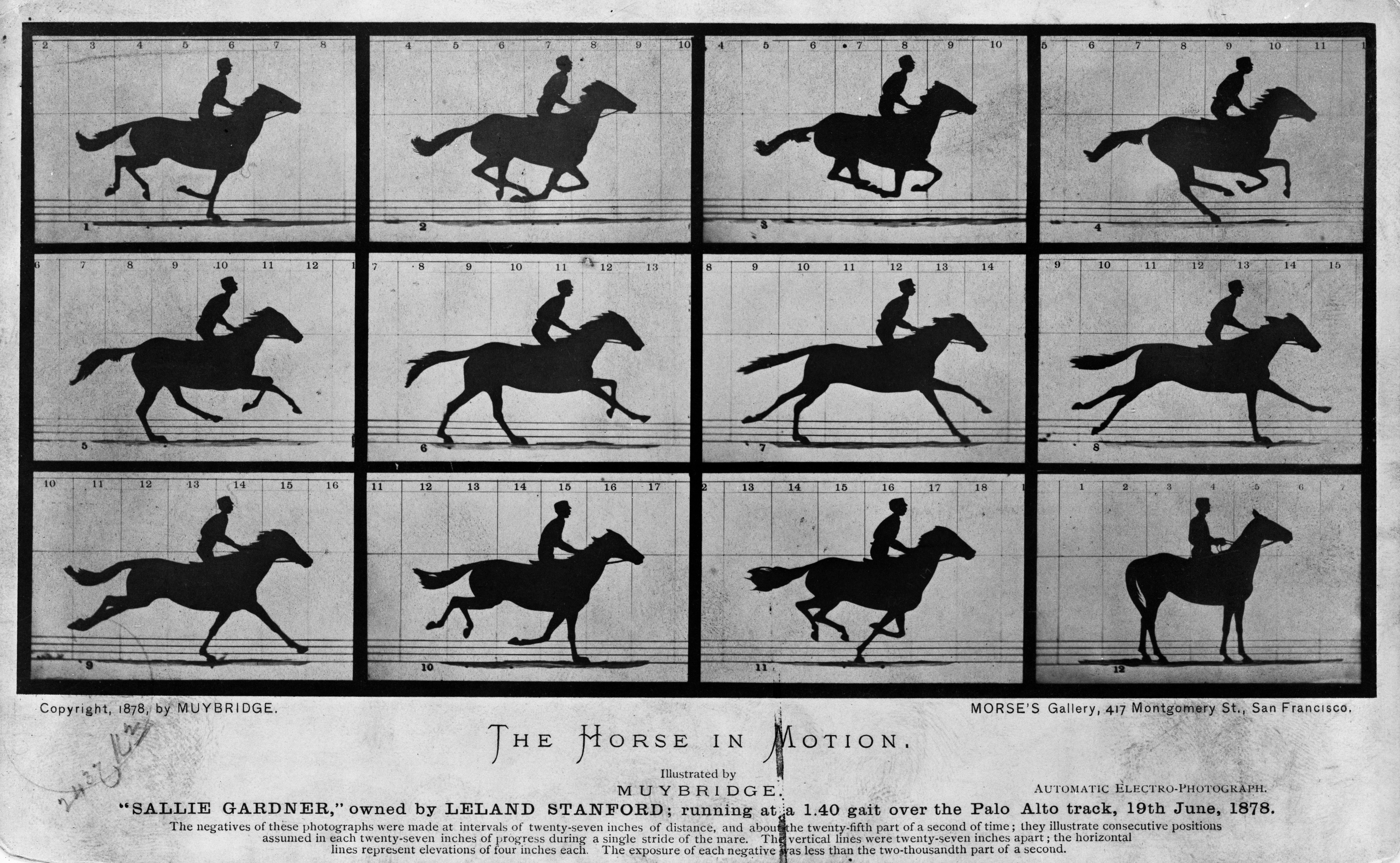
Muybridge's photographs of The Horse in Motion, 1878, were used to answer the question of whether all four feet of a galloping horse are ever off the ground at the same time. This demonstrates a use of photography as an experimental tool in science.

Scientific methodology often directs that hypotheses be tested in controlled conditions wherever possible. This is frequently possible in certain areas, such as in the biological sciences, and more difficult in other areas, such as in astronomy.

The practice of experimental control and reproducibility can have the effect of diminishing the potentially harmful effects of circumstance, and to a degree, personal bias. For example, pre-existing beliefs can alter the interpretation of results, as in confirmation bias; this is a heuristic that leads a person with a particular belief to see things as reinforcing their belief, even if another observer might disagree (in other words, people tend to observe what they expect to observe).

[T]he action of thought is excited by the irritation of doubt, and ceases when belief is attained.

— C.S. Peirce, How to Make Our Ideas Clear (1877)

A historical example is the belief that the legs of a galloping horse are splayed at the point when none of the horse's legs touch the ground, to the point of this image being included in paintings by its supporters. However, the first stop-action pictures of a horse's gallop by Eadweard Muybridge showed this to be false, and that the legs are instead gathered together.

Another important human bias that plays a role is a preference for new, surprising statements (see Appeal to novelty), which can result in a search for evidence that the new is true. Poorly attested beliefs can be believed and acted upon via a less rigorous heuristic.

Goldhaber and Nieto published in 2010 the observation that if theoretical structures with "many closely neighboring subjects are described by connecting theoretical concepts, then the theoretical structure acquires a robustness which makes it increasingly hard – though certainly never impossible – to overturn". When a narrative is constructed its elements become easier to believe.

Fleck (1979), p. 27 notes "Words and ideas are originally phonetic and mental equivalences of the experiences coinciding with them. ... Such proto-ideas are at first always too broad and insufficiently specialized. ... Once a structurally complete and closed system of opinions consisting of many details and relations has been formed, it offers enduring resistance to anything that contradicts it". Sometimes, these relations have their elements assumed a priori, or contain some other logical or methodological flaw in the process that ultimately produced them. Donald M. MacKay has analyzed these elements in terms of limits to the accuracy of measurement and has related them to instrumental elements in a category of measurement. (Note: The scientific method requires testing and validation a posteriori before ideas are accepted.)

=== Deductive and inductive reasoning ===
The idea of there being two opposed justifications for truth has shown up throughout the history of scientific method as analysis versus synthesis, non-ampliative/ampliative, or even confirmation and verification. (And there are other kinds of reasoning.) One to use what is observed to build towards fundamental truths – and the other to derive from those fundamental truths more specific principles.

Deductive reasoning derives specific conclusions from established general principles—if the premises are true, the conclusion must be true. Inductive reasoning builds general principles from observations—conclusions are probable but not guaranteed. Scientific inquiry employs both: induction generates hypotheses from observations; deduction predicts testable consequences. This process requires stringent scepticism regarding observed phenomena, because cognitive assumptions can distort the interpretation of initial perceptions.

Precession of the perihelion – exaggerated in the case of Mercury, but observed in the case of S2's apsidal precession around Sagittarius A*

Inductive Deductive Reasoning

An example for how inductive and deductive reasoning works can be found in the history of gravitational theory. (Note: The philosophy of knowledge arising through observation is also called inductivism. A radical proponent of this approach to knowledge was John Stuart Mill who took all knowledge – even mathematical knowledge – to arise from experience through induction. The inductivist approach is still common place, though Mill's extreme views are outdated today.) It took thousands of years of measurements, from the Chaldean, Indian, Persian, Greek, Arabic, and European astronomers, to fully record the motion of planet Earth. (Note: Hipparchus used his own observations of the stars, as well as the observations by Chaldean and Babylonian astronomers to estimate Earth's precession.) Kepler (and others) were then able to build their early theories by generalizing the collected data inductively, and Newton was able to unify prior theory and measurements into the consequences of his laws of motion in 1727. (Note: Isaac Newton (1727) On the System of the World condensed Kepler's law for the planetary motion of Mars, Galileo's law of falling bodies, the motion of the planets of the Solar system, etc. into consequences of his three laws of motion. See Motte's translation (1846))

Another common example of inductive reasoning is the observation of a counterexample to current theory inducing the need for new ideas. Le Verrier in 1859 pointed out problems with the perihelion of Mercury that showed Newton's theory to be at least incomplete. The observed difference of Mercury's precession between Newtonian theory and observation was one of the things that occurred to Einstein as a possible early test of his theory of relativity. His relativistic calculations matched observation much more closely than Newtonian theory did. (Note: The difference is approximately 43 arc-seconds per century. And the precession of Mercury's orbit is cited in Tests of general relativity: U. Le Verrier (1859), (in French), "Lettre de M. Le Verrier à M. Faye sur la théorie de Mercure et sur le mouvement du périhélie de cette planète", Comptes rendus hebdomadaires des séances de l'Académie des sciences (Paris), vol. 49 (1859), pp.379–383.) Though, today's Standard Model of physics suggests that we still do not know at least some of the concepts surrounding Einstein's theory, it holds to this day and is being built on deductively.

A theory being assumed as true and subsequently built on is a common example of deductive reasoning. Theory building on Einstein's achievement can simply state that 'we have shown that this case fulfils the conditions under which general/special relativity applies, therefore its conclusions apply also'. If it was properly shown that 'this case' fulfils the conditions, the conclusion follows. An extension of this is the assumption of a solution to an open problem. This weaker kind of deductive reasoning will get used in current research, when multiple scientists or even teams of researchers are all gradually solving specific cases in working towards proving a larger theory. This often sees hypotheses being revised again and again as new proof emerges.

This way of presenting inductive and deductive reasoning shows part of why science is often presented as being a cycle of iteration. It is important to keep in mind that that cycle's foundations lie in reasoning, and not wholly in the following of procedure.

=== Certainty, probabilities, and statistical inference ===
Claims of scientific truth can be opposed in three ways: by falsifying them, by questioning their certainty, or by asserting the claim itself to be incoherent. (Note: ...simplified and (post-modern) philosophy notwithstanding.Gauch Jr (2002), p. 33) Incoherence, here, means internal errors in logic, like stating opposites to be true; falsification is what Popper would have called the honest work of conjecture and refutation — certainty, perhaps, is where difficulties in telling truths from non-truths arise most easily.

Scientific measurements include uncertainty estimates, calculated through repeated measurements, error propagation from underlying quantities, or sampling limitations. uncertainty. Counts of things may represent a sample of desired quantities, with an uncertainty that depends upon the sampling method used and the number of samples taken.

In the case of measurement imprecision, there will simply be a 'probable deviation' expressing itself in a study's conclusions. Statistics are different. Inductive statistical generalisation will take sample data and extrapolate more general conclusions, which has to be justified — and scrutinised. It can even be said that statistical models are only ever useful, but never a complete representation of circumstances.

In statistical analysis, expected and unexpected bias is a large factor. Research questions, the collection of data, or the interpretation of results, all are subject to larger amounts of scrutiny than in comfortably logical environments. Statistical models go through a process for validation, for which one could even say that awareness of potential biases is more important than the hard logic; errors in logic are easier to find in peer review, after all. (Note: ... and John Ioannidis, in 2005, has shown that not everybody respects the principles of statistical analysis; whether they be the principles of inference or otherwise.) More general, claims to rational knowledge, and especially statistics, have to be put into their appropriate context. Simple statements such as '9 out of 10 doctors recommend' are therefore of unknown quality because they do not justify their methodology.

Lack of familiarity with statistical methodologies can result in erroneous conclusions. Foregoing the easy example, (Note: For instance, extrapolating from a single scientific observation, such as "This experiment yielded these results, so it should apply broadly," exemplifies inductive wishful thinking. Statistical generalisation is a form of inductive reasoning. Conversely, assuming that a specific outcome will occur based on general trends observed across multiple experiments, as in "Most experiments have shown this pattern, so it will likely occur in this case as well," illustrates faulty deductive probability logic.) multiple probabilities interacting is where, for example medical professionals, have shown a lack of proper understanding. Bayes' theorem is the mathematical principle lining out how standing probabilities are adjusted given new information. The boy or girl paradox is a common example. In knowledge representation, Bayesian estimation of mutual information between random variables is a way to measure dependence, independence, or interdependence of the information under scrutiny.

Beyond commonly associated survey methodology of field research, the concept together with probabilistic reasoning is used to advance fields of science where research objects have no definitive states of being. For example, in statistical mechanics.

== Methods of inquiry ==
=== Hypothetico-deductive method ===
The hypothetico-deductive model, or hypothesis-testing method, or "traditional" scientific method forms a hypotheses, tests it via experimentation and conclusions are described.

A hypothesis makes predictions; the hypothesis is tested and the predictions are evaluated based on the experimental evidence.. Assuming complete knowledge is not possible (vs., mathematics or philosophy), the hypothesis cannot be "proven", it can only be disproven.

Scientists observe if the hypothetical consequences a (potential) theory are not dis-proven by experimental evidence. If an experimental test of those hypothetical consequences shows them to be false, it follows logically that the part of the theory that implied them was false also. If they show as not false, however, it supports the truth of the hypothesis ("supports" vs. "proving" the hypothesis as true). The lack of falseness does not prove the hypothesis.

The formulated hypothesis is assumed to be 'true', and from that 'true' statement implications are inferred. If experimental evidence does not align with implications of the hypothesis, it follows that the hypothesis itself is false.

Results which don't disprove the hypothesis here will imply the truth of (but not prove) the hypothesis. This is because, in deductive inference (where the truth or falseness of the conclusion "B" is the goal) the hypothesis ("if A then B") is not knowable through showing "B" to be true; only "If not B then not A" is valid logic (see above). Positive outcomes of experiments which show evidence of "B" to be true, as Hempel put it, provide "at least some support, some corroboration or confirmation for (the hypothesis)". This is why Popper insisted on fielded hypotheses to be falsifiable, as successful tests imply very little otherwise. As Gillies put it, "successful theories are those that survive elimination through falsification".

Abductive reasoning is an alternative deductive hypothesis framework, which results in a plausibility conclusion, as opposed to a truth/false conclusion.

=== Inductive method ===
The inductivist approach to deriving scientific truth first rose to prominence with Francis Bacon and particularly with Isaac Newton and those who followed him. Today's inductive method is most-associated with data-mining projects or large-scale observation projects. In both these cases, it is often not at all clear what the results of proposed experiments will be, and thus knowledge will arise after the collection of data through inductive reasoning.

The inductive approach usually formulates only a research question, not a hypothesis. Following the initial question, a suitable "high-throughput method" of data-collection is determined, the resulting data processed, and conclusions drawn.

The advantage the inductive method has over methods formulating a hypothesis that it is essentially free of researcher bias regarding the subject. Inductive reasoning is always attached to a measure of certainty. An example of the inductive approach is in the determination of large primes, which are used in encryption software.

=== Mathematical modelling ===
Mathematical modelling, or allochthonous reasoning, typically is the formulation of a hypothesis followed by building mathematical constructs that can be tested in place of conducting physical laboratory experiments. This approach has two main factors: simplification/abstraction and secondly a set of correspondence rules. The correspondence rules lay out how the constructed model will relate back to reality-how truth is derived; and the simplifying steps taken in the abstraction of the given system are to reduce factors that do not bear relevance and thereby reduce unexpected errors. These steps can also help the researcher in understanding the important factors of the system, how far parsimony can be taken until the system becomes more and more unchangeable and thereby stable. Parsimony and related principles are further explored below.

Once this translation into mathematics is complete, the resulting model, in place of the corresponding system, can be analysed through purely mathematical and computational means. The results of this analysis are of course also purely mathematical in nature and get translated back to the system as it exists in reality via the previously determined correspondence rules—iteration following review and interpretation of the findings. The way such models are reasoned will often be mathematically deductive—but they don't have to be. An example here are Monte-Carlo simulations. These generate empirical data "arbitrarily", and, while they may not be able to reveal universal principles, they can nevertheless be useful.

== Scientific inquiry ==
Scientific inquiry generally aims to obtain knowledge in the form of testable explanations that scientists can use to predict the results of future experiments. This allows scientists to gain a better understanding of the topic under study, and later to use that understanding to intervene in its causal mechanisms (such as to cure disease). The better an explanation is at making predictions, the more useful it frequently can be, and the more likely it will continue to explain a body of evidence better than its alternatives. The most successful explanations – those that explain and make accurate predictions in a wide range of circumstances – are often called scientific theories.

Most experimental results do not produce large changes in human understanding; improvements in theoretical scientific understanding typically result from a gradual process of development over time, sometimes across different domains of science. Scientific models vary in the extent to which they have been experimentally tested and for how long, and in their acceptance in the scientific community. In general, explanations become accepted over time as evidence accumulates on a given topic, and the explanation in question proves more powerful than its alternatives at explaining the evidence. Often subsequent researchers re-formulate the explanations over time, or combined explanations to produce new explanations.

=== Properties of scientific inquiry ===
Scientific knowledge is closely tied to empirical findings and can remain subject to falsification if new experimental observations are incompatible with what is found. That is, no theory can ever be considered final since new problematic evidence might be discovered. If such evidence is found, a new theory may be proposed, or (more commonly) it is found that modifications to the previous theory are sufficient to explain the new evidence. The strength of a theory relates to how long it has persisted without major alteration to its core principles.

Theories can also become subsumed by other theories. For example, Newton's laws explained thousands of years of scientific observations of the planets almost perfectly. However, these laws were then determined to be special cases of a more general theory (relativity), which explained both the (previously unexplained) exceptions to Newton's laws and predicted and explained other observations such as the deflection of light by gravity. Thus, in certain cases independent, unconnected, scientific observations can be connected, unified by principles of increasing explanatory power.

Since new theories might be more comprehensive than what preceded them, and thus be able to explain more than previous ones, successor theories might be able to meet a higher standard by explaining a larger body of observations than their predecessors. For example, the theory of evolution explains the diversity of life on Earth, how species adapt to their environments, and many other patterns observed in the natural world; its most recent major modification was unification with genetics to form the modern evolutionary synthesis. In subsequent modifications, it has also subsumed aspects of many other fields such as biochemistry and molecular biology.

== Heuristics ==
=== Confirmation theory ===
During the course of history, one theory has succeeded another, and some have suggested further work while others have seemed content just to explain the phenomena. The reasons why one theory has replaced another are not always obvious or simple. The philosophy of science includes the question: What criteria are satisfied by a 'good' theory. This question has a long history, and many scientists, as well as philosophers, have considered it. The objective is to be able to choose one theory as preferable to another without introducing cognitive bias. Though different thinkers emphasize different aspects, (Note: Differing accounts of which elements constitute a good theory: Kuhn (1977) identified: accuracy; consistency (both internal and with other relevant currently accepted theories); scope (its consequences should extend beyond the data it is required to explain); simplicity (organizing otherwise confused and isolated phenomena); fruitfulness (for further research); Colyvan (2001) listed simplicity/parsimony, unificatory/explanatory power, boldness/fruitfulness, and elegance; Weinert (2004) noted the recurring theme of invariance; (Note: Friedel Weinert in The Scientist as Philosopher (2004) noted the theme of invariance as a fundamental aspect of a scientific account of reality in many writings from around 1900 onward, such as works by Henri Poincaré (1902), Ernst Cassirer (1920), Max Born (1949 and 1953), Paul Dirac (1958), Olivier Costa de Beauregard (1966), Eugene Wigner (1967), Lawrence Sklar (1974), Michael Friedman (1983), John D. Norton (1992), Nicholas Maxwell (1993), Alan Cook (1994), Alistair Cameron Crombie (1994), Margaret Morrison (1995), Richard Feynman (1997), Robert Nozick (2001), and Tim Maudlin (2002). — Deutsch in a 2009 TED talk proclaimed that "the search for hard-to-vary explanations is the origin of all progress".); Hawking (2010): simplicity/parsimony, unificatory/explanatory power, and elegance, but did not mention fruitfulness.) good theories are accurate, internally consistent, explanatory beyond required data, unifying of disparate phenomena, and fruitful for research. When empirical evidence is limited, scientists favor parsimony and invariant observations. Scientists will sometimes also list the very subjective criteria of "formal elegance" which can indicate multiple different things.

The goal here is to make the choice between theories less arbitrary. Nonetheless, these criteria contain subjective elements, and should be considered heuristics rather than a definitive. (Note: ...Hawking & Mlodinow on criteria for a good theory: "The above criteria are obviously subjective. Elegance, for example, is not something easily measured, but it is highly prized among scientists." The idea of 'too baroque' is connected to 'simplicity': "a theory jammed with fudge factors is not very elegant. To paraphrase Einstein, a theory should be as simple as possible, but not simpler". See also:) Also, criteria such as these do not necessarily decide between alternative theories. Quoting Bird:

"[Such criteria] cannot determine scientific choice. First, which features of a theory satisfy these criteria may be disputable (e.g. does simplicity concern the ontological commitments of a theory or its mathematical form?). Secondly, these criteria are imprecise, and so there is room for disagreement about the degree to which they hold. Thirdly, there can be disagreement about how they are to be weighted relative to one another, especially when they conflict."

It also is debatable whether existing scientific theories satisfy all these criteria, which may represent goals not yet achieved. For example, explanatory power over all existing observations is satisfied by no one theory at the moment.

==== Parsimony ====
The desiderata of a "good" theory have been debated for centuries, going back perhaps even earlier than Occam's razor, (Note: Occam's razor, sometimes referred to as "ontological parsimony", is roughly stated as: Given a choice between two theories, the simplest is the best. This suggestion commonly is attributed to William of Ockham in the 14th-century, although it probably predates him.) which is often taken as an attribute of a good theory. Science tries to be simple. When gathered data supports multiple explanations, the most simple explanation for phenomena or the most simple formation of a theory is recommended by the principle of parsimony. Scientists go as far as to call simple proofs of complex statements beautiful.

We are to admit no more causes of natural things than such as are both true and sufficient to explain their appearances.

— Isaac Newton, Philosophiæ Naturalis Principia Mathematica (1723 [3rd ed.])

The concept of parsimony should not be held to imply complete frugality in the pursuit of scientific truth. The general process starts at the opposite end of there being a vast number of potential explanations and general disorder. An example can be seen in Paul Krugman's process, who makes explicit to "dare to be silly". He writes that in his work on new theories of international trade he reviewed prior work with an open frame of mind and broadened his initial viewpoint even in unlikely directions. Once he had a sufficient body of ideas, he would try to simplify and thus find what worked among what did not. Specific to Krugman here was to "question the question". He recognised that prior work had applied erroneous models to already present evidence, commenting that "intelligent commentary was ignored". (Note: Krugman, Paul (1993). "How I Work". The American Economist. 37 (2). Sage Publications, Inc.: 25–31. doi:10.1177/056943459303700204. ISSN 0569-4345. JSTOR 25603965. ...I have already implicitly given my four basic rules for research. Let me now state them explicitly, then explain. Here are the rules: 1. Listen to the Gentiles; 2. Question the question; 3. Dare to be silly; 4. Simplify, simplify) Thus touching on the need to bridge the common bias against other circles of thought.

==== Elegance ====
Occam's razor might fall under the heading of "simple elegance", but it is arguable that parsimony and elegance pull in different directions. Introducing additional elements could simplify theory formulation, whereas simplifying a theory's ontology might lead to increased syntactical complexity.

Sometimes ad-hoc modifications of a failing idea may also be dismissed as lacking "formal elegance". This appeal to what may be called "aesthetic" is hard to characterise, but essentially about a sort of familiarity. Though, argument based on "elegance" is contentious and over-reliance on familiarity will breed stagnation.

==== Invariance ====
Principles of invariance have been a theme in scientific writing, and especially physics, since at least the early 20th century. The basic idea here is that good structures to look for are those independent of perspective, an idea that has featured earlier of course for example in Mill's Methods of difference and agreement—methods that would be referred back to in the context of contrast and invariance. But as tends to be the case, there is a difference between something being a basic consideration and something being given weight. Principles of invariance have only been given weight in the wake of Einstein's theories of relativity, which reduced everything to relations and were thereby fundamentally unchangeable, unable to be varied. (Note: Arthur Eddington, 1920: "The relativity theory of physics reduces everything to relations; that is to say, it is structure, not material, which counts." — Weinert, giving the Einstein example and quoting: "Eddington, Space, Time and Gravitation (1920), 197") As David Deutsch put it in 2009: "the search for hard-to-vary explanations is the origin of all progress".

An example here can be found in one of Einstein's thought experiments. The one of a lab suspended in empty space is an example of a useful invariant observation. He imagined the absence of gravity and an experimenter free floating in the lab. — If now an entity pulls the lab upwards, accelerating uniformly, the experimenter would perceive the resulting force as gravity. The entity however would feel the work needed to accelerate the lab continuously. Through this experiment Einstein was able to equate gravitational and inertial mass; something unexplained by Newton's laws, and an early but "powerful argument for a generalised postulate of relativity".

The feature, which suggests reality, is always some kind of invariance of a structure independent of the aspect, the projection.

— Max Born, 'Physical Reality' (1953), 149 — as quoted by Weinert (2004)

The discussion on invariance in physics is often had in the more specific context of symmetry. The Einstein example above, in the parlance of Mill would be an agreement between two values. In the context of invariance, it is a variable that remains unchanged through some kind of transformation or change in perspective. And discussion focused on symmetry would view the two perspectives as systems that share a relevant aspect and are therefore symmetrical.

Related principles here are falsifiability and testability. The opposite of something being hard-to-vary are theories that resist falsification—a frustration that was expressed colourfully by Wolfgang Pauli as them being "not even wrong". The importance of scientific theories to be falsifiable finds especial emphasis in the philosophy of Karl Popper. The broader view here is testability, since it includes the former and allows for additional practical considerations.

== Philosophy and discourse ==
Philosophy of science looks at the underpinning logic of the scientific method, at what separates science from non-science, and the ethic that is implicit in science. There are basic assumptions, derived from philosophy by at least one prominent scientist, (Note: Never fail to recognize an idea... .— C. S. Peirce, ILLUSTRATIONS OF THE LOGIC OF SCIENCE, SECOND PAPER. —HOW TO MAKE OUR IDEAS CLEAR. Popular Science Monthly Volume 12, January 1878, p.286) that form the base of the scientific method – namely, that reality is objective and consistent, that humans have the capacity to perceive reality accurately, and that rational explanations exist for elements of the real world. These assumptions from methodological naturalism form a basis on which science may be grounded. Logical positivist, empiricist, falsificationist, and other theories have criticized these assumptions and given alternative accounts of the logic of science, but each has also itself been criticized.

There are several kinds of modern philosophical conceptualizations and attempts at definitions of the method of science. (Note: There is no universally agreed upon definition of the method of science. This was expressed with Neurath's boat already in 1913. There is however a consensus that stating this somewhat nihilistic assertion without introduction and in too unexpected a fashion is counterproductive, confusing, and can even be damaging. There may never be one, too. As Weinberg described it in 1995: The fact that the standards of scientific success shift with time does not only make the philosophy of science difficult; it also raises problems for the public understanding of science. We do not have a fixed scientific method to rally around and defend.) The one attempted by the unificationists, who argue for the existence of a unified definition that is useful (or at least 'works' in every context of science). The pluralists, arguing degrees of science being too fractured for a universal definition of its method to by useful. And those, who argue that the very attempt at definition is already detrimental to the free flow of ideas.

Additionally, there have been views on the social framework in which science is done, and the impact of the sciences social environment on research. Also, there is 'scientific method' as popularised by Dewey in How We Think (1910) and Karl Pearson in Grammar of Science (1892), as used in fairly uncritical manner in education.

=== Pluralism ===
Scientific pluralism is a position within the philosophy of science that rejects various proposed unities of scientific method and subject matter. Scientific pluralists hold that science is not unified in one or more of the following ways: the metaphysics of its subject matter, the epistemology of scientific knowledge, or the research methods and models that should be used. Some pluralists believe that pluralism is necessary due to the nature of science. Others say that since scientific disciplines already vary in practice, there is no reason to believe this variation is wrong until a specific unification is empirically proven. Finally, some hold that pluralism should be allowed for normative reasons, even if unity were possible in theory.

=== Unificationism ===
Unificationism, in science, was a central tenet of logical positivism. Different logical positivists construed this doctrine in several different ways, e.g. as a reductionist thesis, that the objects investigated by the special sciences reduce to the objects of a common, putatively more basic domain of science, usually thought to be physics; as the thesis that all theories and results of the various sciences can or ought to be expressed in a common language or "universal slang"; or as the thesis that all the special sciences share a common scientific method. (Note: The topics of study, as expressed in the vocabulary of its scientists, are approached by a "single unified method". A topic is unified by its predicates, which describe a system of mathematical expressions. The values which a predicate might take, then serve as witness to the validity of a predicated expression (that is, true or false; 'predicted but not yet observed'; 'corroborates', etc.).)

Development of the idea has been troubled by accelerated advancement in technology that has opened up many new ways to look at the world.

The fact that the standards of scientific success shift with time does not only make the philosophy of science difficult; it also raises problems for the public understanding of science. We do not have a fixed scientific method to rally around and defend.

— Steven Weinberg, 1995

=== Epistemological anarchism ===
Paul Feyerabend examined the history of science, and was led to deny that science is genuinely a methodological process. In his 1975 book Against Method he argued that no description of scientific method could possibly be broad enough to include all the approaches and methods used by scientists, and that there are no useful and exception-free methodological rules governing the progress of science. In essence, he said that for any specific method or norm of science, one can find a historic episode where violating it has contributed to the progress of science. He jokingly suggested that, if believers in the scientific method wish to express a single universally valid rule, it should be 'anything goes'. As has been argued before him however, this is uneconomic; problem solvers, and researchers are to be prudent with their resources during their inquiry. (Note: Peirce (1899) First rule of logic (F.R.L) Paragraph 1.136: From the first rule of logic, if we truly desire the goal of the inquiry we are not to waste our resources. — Terence Tao wrote on the matter that not all approaches can be regarded as "equally suitable and deserving of equal resources" because such positions would "sap mathematics of its sense of direction and purpose".)

A more general inference against formalised method has been found through research involving interviews with scientists regarding their conception of method. This research indicated that scientists frequently encounter difficulty in determining whether the available evidence supports their hypotheses. This reveals that there are no straightforward mappings between overarching methodological concepts and precise strategies to direct the conduct of research.

=== Education ===
In science education, the idea of a general and universal scientific method has been notably influential, and numerous studies (in the US) have shown that this framing of method often forms part of both students' and teachers' conception of science. This convention of traditional education has been argued against by scientists, as there is a consensus that educations' sequential elements and unified view of scientific method do not reflect how scientists actually work. Major organizations of scientists such as the American Association for the Advancement of Science (AAAS) consider the sciences to be a part of the liberal arts traditions of learning and proper understating of science includes understanding of philosophy and history, not just science in isolation.

How the sciences make knowledge has been taught in the context of "the" scientific method (singular) since the early 20th century. Various systems of education, including but not limited to the US, have taught the method of science as a process or procedure, structured as a definitive series of steps: (Note: Traditionally 5, after Dewey's 1910 idea of a "complete act of thought". He held that thought-process best represented science (for education). These steps would end up being simplified and adjusted, often shortened to 4, or extended to include various practices.) observation, hypothesis, prediction, experiment.

This version of the method of science has been a long-established standard in primary and secondary education, as well as the biomedical sciences. (Note: Specifically, the scientific method has featured in introductory science courses for biology, medicine, and psychology. Also, in education in general.) It has long been held to be an inaccurate idealisation of how some scientific inquiries are structured.

Traditional science education faced criticism for presenting an oversimplified, singular methodology that overemphasized experimentation, ignored social context, and suggested automatic knowledge generation through procedural steps.

The scientific method no longer features in the standards for US education of 2013 (NGSS) that replaced those of 1996 (NRC). They, too, influenced international science education, and the standards measured for have shifted since from the singular hypothesis-testing method to a broader conception of scientific methods. These scientific methods, which are rooted in scientific practices and not epistemology, are described as the 3 dimensions of scientific and engineering practices, crosscutting concepts (interdisciplinary ideas), and disciplinary core ideas.

The scientific method, as a result of simplified and universal explanations, is often held to have reached a kind of mythological status; as a tool for communication or, at best, an idealisation. Education's approach was heavily influenced by John Dewey's, How We Think (1910). Van der Ploeg (2016) indicated that Dewey's views on education had long been used to further an idea of citizen education removed from "sound education", claiming that references to Dewey in such arguments were undue interpretations (of Dewey).

=== Sociology of knowledge ===
The sociology of knowledge is a concept in the discussion around scientific method, claiming the underlying method of science to be sociological. King explains that sociology distinguishes here between the system of ideas that govern the sciences through an inner logic, and the social system in which those ideas arise. (Note: "The sociology of knowledge is concerned with "the relationship between human thought and the social context in which it arises." So, on this reading, the sociology of science may be taken to be considered with the analysis of the social context of scientific thought. But scientific thought, most sociologists concede, is distinguished from other modes of thought precisely by virtue of its immunity from social determination — insofar as it is governed by reason rather than by tradition, and insofar as it is rational it escapes determination by "non-logical" social forces." — M. D. King leading into his article on Reason, tradition, and the progressiveness of science (1971))

==== Thought collectives ====
A perhaps accessible lead into what is claimed is Fleck's thought, echoed in Kuhn's concept of normal science. According to Fleck, scientists' work is based on a thought-style, that cannot be rationally reconstructed. It gets instilled through the experience of learning, and science is then advanced based on a tradition of shared assumptions held by what he called thought collectives. Fleck also claims this phenomenon to be largely invisible to members of the group.

Comparably, following the field research in an academic scientific laboratory by Latour and Woolgar, Karin Knorr Cetina has conducted a comparative study of two scientific fields (namely high energy physics and molecular biology) to conclude that the epistemic practices and reasonings within both scientific communities are different enough to introduce the concept of "epistemic cultures", in contradiction with the idea that a so-called "scientific method" is unique and a unifying concept. (Note: Comparing 'epistemic cultures' with Fleck 1935, Thought collectives, (denkkollektiven): Entstehung und Entwicklung einer wissenschaftlichen Tatsache: Einfǖhrung in die Lehre vom Denkstil und Denkkollektiv Fleck (1979), p. xxvii recognizes that facts have lifetimes, flourishing only after incubation periods. His selected question for investigation (1934) was "HOW, THEN, DID THIS EMPIRICAL FACT ORIGINATE AND IN WHAT DOES IT CONSIST?". But by Fleck 1979, p.27, the thought collectives within the respective fields will have to settle on common specialized terminology, publish their results and further intercommunicate with their colleagues using the common terminology, in order to progress.)

==== Situated cognition and relativism ====
On the idea of Fleck's thought collectives sociologists built the concept of situated cognition: that the perspective of the researcher fundamentally affects their work; and, too, more radical views.

Norwood Russell Hanson, alongside Thomas Kuhn and Paul Feyerabend, extensively explored the theory-laden nature of observation in science. Hanson introduced the concept in 1958, emphasizing that observation is influenced by the observer's conceptual framework. He used the concept of gestalt to show how preconceptions can affect both observation and description, and illustrated this with examples like the initial rejection of Golgi bodies as an artefact of staining technique, and the differing interpretations of the same sunrise by Tycho Brahe and Johannes Kepler. Intersubjectivity led to different conclusions.

Kuhn and Feyerabend acknowledged Hanson's pioneering work, although Feyerabend's views on methodological pluralism were more radical. Criticisms like those from Kuhn and Feyerabend prompted discussions leading to the development of the strong programme, a sociological approach that seeks to explain scientific knowledge without recourse to the truth or validity of scientific theories. It examines how scientific beliefs are shaped by social factors such as power, ideology, and interests.

The postmodernist critiques of science have themselves been the subject of intense controversy. This ongoing debate, known as the science wars, is the result of conflicting values and assumptions between postmodernist and realist perspectives. Postmodernists argue that scientific knowledge is merely a discourse, devoid of any claim to fundamental truth. In contrast, realists within the scientific community maintain that science uncovers real and fundamental truths about reality. Many books have been written by scientists which take on this problem and challenge the assertions of the postmodernists while defending science as a legitimate way of deriving truth.

== Limits of method ==
=== Role of chance in discovery ===
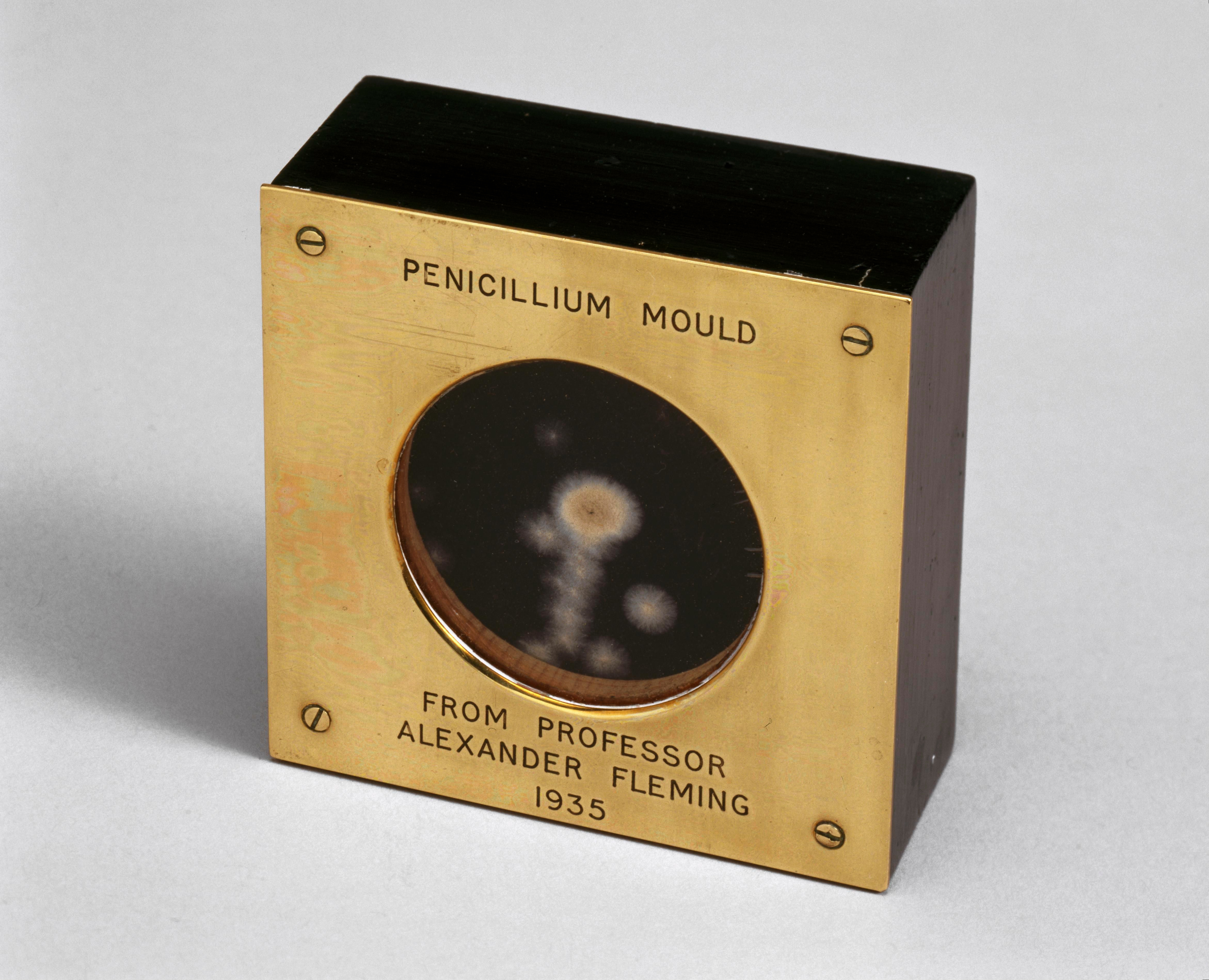
A famous example of discovery being stumbled upon was Alexander Fleming's discovery of penicillin. One of his bacteria cultures got contaminated with mould in which surroundings the bacteria had died off; thereby the method of discovery was simply knowing what to look out for.

Somewhere between 33% and 50% of all scientific discoveries are estimated to have been stumbled upon, rather than sought out. This may explain why scientists so often express that they were lucky. Scientists themselves in the 19th and 20th century acknowledged the role of fortunate luck or serendipity in discoveries. Louis Pasteur is credited with the famous saying that "Luck favours the prepared mind", but some psychologists have begun to study what it means to be 'prepared for luck' in the scientific context. Research is showing that scientists are taught various heuristics that tend to harness chance and the unexpected. This is what Nassim Nicholas Taleb calls "Anti-fragility"; while some systems of investigation are fragile in the face of human error, human bias, and randomness, the scientific method is more than resistant or tough – it actually benefits from such randomness in many ways (it is anti-fragile). Taleb believes that the more anti-fragile the system, the more it will flourish in the real world.

Psychologist Kevin Dunbar says the process of discovery often starts with researchers finding bugs in their experiments. These unexpected results lead researchers to try to fix what they think is an error in their method. Eventually, the researcher decides the error is too persistent and systematic to be a coincidence. The highly controlled, cautious, and curious aspects of the scientific method are thus what make it well suited for identifying such persistent systematic errors. At this point, the researcher will begin to think of theoretical explanations for the error, often seeking the help of colleagues across different domains of expertise.

=== Relationship with statistics ===
When the scientific method employs statistics as a key part of its arsenal, there are mathematical and practical issues that can have a deleterious effect on the reliability of the output of scientific methods. This is described in a popular 2005 scientific paper "Why Most Published Research Findings Are False" by John Ioannidis, which is considered foundational to the field of metascience. Much research in metascience seeks to identify poor use of statistics and improve its use, an example being the misuse of p-values.

The points raised are both statistical and economical. Statistically, research findings are less likely to be true when studies are small and when there is significant flexibility in study design, definitions, outcomes, and analytical approaches. Economically, the reliability of findings decreases in fields with greater financial interests, biases, and a high level of competition among research teams. As a result, most research findings are considered false across various designs and scientific fields, particularly in modern biomedical research, which often operates in areas with very low pre- and post-study probabilities of yielding true findings. Nevertheless, despite these challenges, most new discoveries will continue to arise from hypothesis-generating research that begins with low or very low pre-study odds. This suggests that expanding the frontiers of knowledge will depend on investigating areas outside the mainstream, where the chances of success may initially appear slim.

=== Science of complex systems ===
Science applied to complex systems can involve elements such as transdisciplinarity, systems theory, control theory, and scientific modelling.

In general, the scientific method may be difficult to apply stringently to diverse, interconnected systems and large data sets. In particular, practices used within Big data, such as predictive analytics, may be considered to be at odds with the scientific method, as some of the data may have been stripped of the parameters which might be material in alternative hypotheses for an explanation; thus the stripped data would only serve to support the null hypothesis in the predictive analytics application. Fleck (1979), pp. 38–50 notes "a scientific discovery remains incomplete without considerations of the social practices that condition it".

== Relationship with mathematics ==
Science is the process of gathering, comparing, and evaluating proposed models against observables. A model can be a simulation, mathematical or chemical formula, or set of proposed steps. Science is like mathematics in that researchers in both disciplines try to distinguish what is known from what is unknown at each stage of discovery. Models, in both science and mathematics, need to be internally consistent and also ought to be falsifiable (capable of disproof). In mathematics, a statement need not yet be proved; at such a stage, that statement would be called a conjecture.

Mathematical work and scientific work can inspire each other. For example, the technical concept of time arose in science, and timelessness was a hallmark of a mathematical topic. But today, the Poincaré conjecture has been proved using time as a mathematical concept in which objects can flow (see Ricci flow).

Nevertheless, the connection between mathematics and reality (and so science to the extent it describes reality) remains obscure. Eugene Wigner's paper, "The Unreasonable Effectiveness of Mathematics in the Natural Sciences", is a very well-known account of the issue from a Nobel Prize-winning physicist. In fact, some observers (including some well-known mathematicians such as Gregory Chaitin, and others such as Lakoff and Núñez) have suggested that mathematics is the result of practitioner bias and human limitation (including cultural ones), somewhat like the post-modernist view of science.

George Pólya's work on problem solving, the construction of mathematical proofs, and heuristic show that the mathematical method and the scientific method differ in detail, while nevertheless resembling each other in using iterative or recursive steps.

	Mathematical method	Scientific method
1	Understanding	Characterization from experience and observation
2	Analysis	Hypothesis: a proposed explanation
3	Synthesis	Deduction: prediction from the hypothesis
4	Review/Extend	Test and experiment

In Pólya's view, understanding involves restating unfamiliar definitions in your own words, resorting to geometrical figures, and questioning what we know and do not know already; analysis, which Pólya takes from Pappus, involves free and heuristic construction of plausible arguments, working backward from the goal, and devising a plan for constructing the proof; synthesis is the strict Euclidean exposition of step-by-step details of the proof; review involves reconsidering and re-examining the result and the path taken to it.

Building on Pólya's work, Imre Lakatos argued that mathematicians actually use contradiction, criticism, and revision as principles for improving their work. (Note: Stillwell's review (p. 381) of Poincaré's efforts on the Euler characteristic notes that it took five iterations for Poincaré to arrive at the Poincaré homology sphere.) In like manner to science, where truth is sought, but certainty is not found, in Proofs and Refutations, what Lakatos tried to establish was that no theorem of informal mathematics is final or perfect. This means that, in non-axiomatic mathematics, we should not think that a theorem is ultimately true, only that no counterexample has yet been found. Once a counterexample, i.e. an entity contradicting/not explained by the theorem is found, we adjust the theorem, possibly extending the domain of its validity. This is a continuous way our knowledge accumulates, through the logic and process of proofs and refutations. (However, if axioms are given for a branch of mathematics, this creates a logical system —Wittgenstein 1921 Tractatus Logico-Philosophicus 5.13; Lakatos claimed that proofs from such a system were tautological, i.e. internally logically true, by rewriting forms, as shown by Poincaré, who demonstrated the technique of transforming tautologically true forms (viz. the Euler characteristic) into or out of forms from homology, or more abstractly, from homological algebra.

Lakatos proposed an account of mathematical knowledge based on Polya's idea of heuristics. In Proofs and Refutations, Lakatos gave several basic rules for finding proofs and counterexamples to conjectures. He thought that mathematical 'thought experiments' are a valid way to discover mathematical conjectures and proofs.

Gauss, when asked how he came about his theorems, once replied "durch planmässiges Tattonieren" (through systematic palpable experimentation).

== See also ==
- Evidence-based practice – Pragmatic methodology, and systematic inventive thinking (SIT)
- Outline of scientific method
- Methodology (Study of research) and the scientific study of science (metascience)
- Quantitative research – All procedures for the numerical representation of empirical facts
- Research transparency and bias
- Scientific law – Statement based on repeated empirical observations that describes some natural phenomenon
- Scientific protocol
- Testability – Ability to examine a theory by experimentation
