= Hugo Dingler =

German scientist and philosopher (1881–1954)

Hugo Albert Emil Hermann Dingler (July 7, 1881, Munich – June 29, 1954, Munich) was a German scientist and philosopher.

== Life ==
Hugo Dingler studied mathematics, philosophy, and physics with Felix Klein, Hermann Minkowski, David Hilbert, Edmund Husserl, Woldemar Voigt, and Wilhem Roentgen at the University of Göttingen and the Ludwig-Maximilians-Universität München. He graduated from the Ludwig-Maximilians-Universität München with a thesis under Aurel Voss. Dingler earned his Ph.D. in mathematics, physics and astronomy in 1906. His doctoral advisor was Ferdinand von Lindemann. In 1910, Dingler's first attempt to earn a Habilitation failed. His second try in 1912 was successful. Dingler then taught as a Privatdozent and held lectures on mathematics, philosophy and the history of science. He became a professor at the Ludwig-Maximilians-Universität München in 1920. Dingler obtained a position as Professor ordinarius at the Technische Universität Darmstadt in 1932.

In 1934, one year after the Nazis took power Dingler was dismissed from his teaching position for still unclear reasons. Dingler himself told several interviewers that this was because of his favorable writings concerning Jews. In fact, both philo-semitic and anti-semitic statements by Dingler had been noted.

From 1934 to 1936, he again held a teaching position.

In 1940, Dingler joined the Nazi Party and was again given a teaching position. Of Dingler's 1944 book Aufbau der exakten Fundamentalwissenschaft only thirty copies survived wartime bombing.

== Thought ==
Dingler's position is usually characterized as "conventionalist" by Karl Popper and others. Sometimes he is called a "radical conventionalist" (also referred to as "critical voluntarism" in the secondary literature), as by the early Rudolf Carnap. Dingler himself initially characterized it as "critical conventionalism", to contrast it with the "naïve conventionalism" of other philosophers such as Poincaré, but he himself later ceased to call his position conventionalist. Dingler agrees with the conventionalists that the fundamental assumptions of geometry and physics are not extracted empirically and cannot be given a transcendental deduction. However, Dingler disagrees with conventionalists such as Henri Poincaré in that he does not believe there is freedom to choose alternative assumptions. Dingler believes that one can give a foundation to mathematics and physics by means of operations as building stones. Dingler claims that this operational analysis leads one to Euclidean geometry and Newtonian mechanics, which are the only possible results.

Dingler opposed Albert Einstein's relativity theory and was therefore opposed and snubbed by most of the leaders of the German physics and mathematics community. This opposition, at least to the theory of general relativity, continues in the work of his follower Paul Lorenzen.

== Influence ==
Paul Lorenzen, noted for his work on constructive foundations of mathematics, was a follower of Dingler, at least with respect to the foundations of geometry and physics. The so-called Erlangen School of followers and allies of Lorenzen, including Kuno Lorenz, Wilhelm Kamlah, and Peter Janich, and more indirectly, Jürgen Mittelstraß, is thus in large part pursuing a modernized version of Dingler's program which claims to incorporate relativity, quantum theory and quantum logic.

== Works ==
- Beiträge zur Kenntnis der infinitesimalen Deformation einer Fläche (thesis directed by Aurel Voss), Amorbach, 1907.
- Grundlinien einer Kritik und exakten Theorie der Wissenschaften, 1907.
- Grenzen und Ziele der Wissenschaft, 1910.
- Die Grundlagen der angewandten Geometrie, Leipzig, 1911 / Die Grundlagen der Geometrie, Stuttgart, 1933.
- Die Grundlagen der Naturphilosophie, 1913
- Die Kultur der Juden – Eine Versöhnung zwischen Religion und Wissenschaft, Leipzig 1919.
- Die Grundlagen der Physik – Synthetische Prinzipien der mathematischen Naturphilosophie, Berlin/Leipzig 1919.
- Physik und Hypothese – Versuch einer induktiven Wissenschaftslehre nebst einer kritischen Analyse der Fundamente der Relativitätstheorie, Berlin/Leipzig 1921.
- Kritische Bemerkungen zu den Grundlagen der Relativitätstheorie, Physikalische Zeitschrift, vol 21 (1920), 668–675. Reissued as pamphlet in Leipzig, 1921.
- Der Zusammenbruch der Wissenschaft und der Primat der Philosophie, Munich, 1926.
- Das Experiment – Sein Wesen und seine Geschichte, Munich, 1928
- Metaphysik und Wissenschaft vom Letzten,, Munich, 1929
- Das System – Das philosophisch-rationale Grundsystem und die exakte Methode der Philosophie, Munich, 1930.
- Philosophie der Logik und Arithmetik, Munich, 1931.
- Geschichte der Naturphilosophie, Berlin, 1932.
- Das Handeln im Sinne des höchsten Zieles, Munich, 1935.
- Die Methode der Physik, Munich, 1938.
- Max Planck und die Begründung der sogenannten modernen theoretischen Physik, Munich, 1939.
- Vom Tierseele zur Menschenseele, Leipzig, 1941.
- Lehrbuch der Exakten Naturwissenschaften, Berlin, 1944. Edited posthumously by Paul Lorenzen as Aufbau der Fundamentalwissenschaften, Munich, 1964.
- Grundriss der methodischen Philosophie, Fuessen, 1949
- Ergreifung des Wirklichen, Munich 1955. Reprinted (with intro. by Kuno Lorenz and Jürgen Mittelstrass), Frankfurt, 1969.
