= Arno Ros =

German philosopher (born 1942)

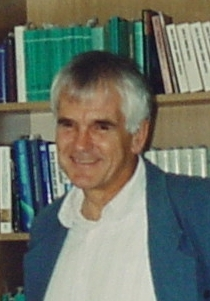
Arno Ros

Arno Ros (born 18 December 1942 in Hamburg) is a German philosopher and Professor of Theoretical Philosophy at the Otto-von-Guericke University Magdeburg in Magdeburg, Germany.

== Biography ==
=== Studies and initial teaching positions ===
Ros studied Ibero-Romance languages, sociology, literature and philosophy in Hamburg, Madrid (Spain) and Coimbra (Portugal). He received his doctorate in 1971 for the dissertation On the theory of literary narrative. He earned his habilitation in Saarbrücken as an assistant of Kuno Lorenz. The title of his habilitation thesis was Philosophy as a methodological critique of meaning. In subsequent years, Ros was a visiting professor in Hamburg, Saarbrücken and Campinas (Brazil).

=== Professor at Magdeburg University ===
Since 1994 he is professor for Theoretical Philosophy at the Otto-von-Guericke University Magdeburg. His main focus is concentrated on systematic and historical problems of argumentation theory with special attention to the theory of concepts (the concept of concept) as well as systematic and historical questions of philosophy of biology and psychology, with particular reference to the philosophical aspects of the mind-matter problem.

Among his students, he is best known and appreciated for his conceptually accurate argumentation and teaching. In his lectures he takes particular care to examine complicated problems by clearly distinguishing between their logical-methodological and historical components.

== Philosophy ==
=== Argumentation theory ===
Ros is known (also because of his activities as a former assistant of Kuno Lorenz) as an expert in argumentation theory and in this field he has researched the concepts of concept, of foundation, of explanation as well as of a typology of explanations (which are distinguished by the different types of causes that they provide). From 1989 to 1990, Ros published Foundation and Concept, a three volume monograph on the concept of concept that spans the history of philosophy from its beginnings in ancient Greece to contemporary Analytical Philosophy.

=== Epistemology and the Task of Philosophy ===
The term 'concept' is understood by Ros along lines suggested by Ludwig Wittgenstein's later work, that is, as a linguistic classificatory ability or habit. The epistemological starting point is that we as subjects can only acquire knowledge about parts of the world by classifying objects (entities), that is, by making use of our classificatory abilities. The problem lies in the fact that our classificatory abilities may be learned, dependent on culture, or biologically conditioned, whereby the possibility of objective justification can be called into question. From this arises the task of philosophy, which, unlike the sciences, does not use or apply our classificatory abilities to interpret reality, but rather reflects upon these very conceptual abilities, that is, investigates whether they are meaningful or reasonable.

=== Philosophy of mind ===
As an argumentation theorist, Ros especially emphasizes that within the philosophy of mind it is critical to first of all specify the problem as exactly as possible. Physical processes have to be distinguished from biological processes because the latter, in contrast to the former, when related to the activities of an organism, are purposeful and are meant as a response to a stimulus. From the concept of organism Ros progresses to the concept of the agent or acting subject, and from this to the concept of person, which is characterized by the criterion of possessing psychological phenomena. In the case of humans, an additional stage is reached, because they are also able to guide themselves by rules.

In Matter and Spirit (2005), Ros presented a thorough analysis of the mind-matter problem. In 2008, he published the essay "Mental Causation and Mereological Explanations", in which he tries to solve the problem of mental causation by means of mereological explanations.

In addition, he has recently published the following papers on the philosophy of mind:

- 1996: "Philosophical aspects of mind-matter problem" (inaugural lecture at the Otto-von-Guericke University of Magdeburg on 26 June 1996)
- 1996: "Observations on the relationship between neurophysiology and psychology"
- 1997: "Reduction, identity and abstraction. Comments on the discussion about the thesis of the identity of physical and psychological phenomena ..."
- 1998: "Comments on the mind-matter problem: What it is about, and how it can be solved."
- 2007: "Freedom of will, agency and chance"
- 2007: "Immediate selfconsciousness: What it is and how it may have evolved."

Ros speaks in the philosophy of mind expressly of psychological (German, psychische) phenomena instead of mental (German, mentale) or spiritual (German, geistige) states (as is common in the current debate). For him, only higher cognitive functions (such as problem solving, use of abstract concepts, etc.) qualify as mental or spiritual, while psychological phenomena must include states such as temper tantrums. Ros therefore avoids using the terms mental and spiritual. After all, the German word Geist is merely a corresponding term for the Greek concept of psyche.

== Publications ==
This is a selection of the works of Arno Ros. The full list of publications can be found in the external links below.

=== Monographs ===
- 1972: On the theory of literary narrative. An interpretation of Cuentos by Juan Rulfo. (Dissertation), Athenaeum, Frankfurt a. M., 1972.
- 1979: Object constitution and concepts of basic linguistic acts, Hain, Königstein / Ts., 1979.
- 1983: Jean Piaget's Genetic Epistemology. Results and open problems, Philosophische Rundschau, Special Issue, JCB Mohr, Tübingen, 1983.
- 1983: Philosophy as a methodical critique of meaning. Problems of conceptual explanation in the modern philosophical tradition from Kant to Wittgenstein.) (Habilitation thesis, unpublished, incorporated in Foundation and Concept).
- 1990: Foundation and Concept. A logical-developmental approach to the understanding of conceptual argumentation, Meiner, Hamburg, 3 vols, 1008 pages, ISBN 978-3-7873-0962-7. Table of Contents
  - 1989: Volume 1:Antiquity, Late Antiquity and Middle Ages.
  - 1990: Volume 2:Early Modernity
  - 1990: Volume 3:Contemporary (20th century)
- 2005: Matter and Spirit. A philosophical inquiry. Mentis, Paderborn, 2005, 686 pages, ISBN 3-89785-397-3. Contents
  - Review by J.R.J. Schirra (PDF file; 127 kB)

=== Papers ===
- 1982: "Causal, teleonomic and teleological explanations", in: Zeitschrift für allgemeine Wissenschaftstheorie, XIII/1982, p. 320-335. Online version
- 1996: "Philosophical aspects of the mind-matter problem", in: 1996 Inaugural lectures at the Otto-von-Guericke University's Faculty of Humanities, Social Sciences and Education in Otto-von-Guericke University Magdeburg, University of Magdeburg, 1996. Online version
- 1996: "Observations on the relationship between neurophysiology and psychology," in Zeitschrift für allgemeine Wissenschaftstheorie, 27/1996, p. 91-130. Online version
- 1997: "Reduction, identity and abstraction. Comments on the discussion about the thesis of the identity of physical and psychological phenomena in analytic philosophy." In Astroh, Michael, Dietfried Gerhardus, Gerhard Heinzmann (ed.): Dialogisches Handeln. Eine Festschrift für Kuno Lorenz., Spektrum, Heidelberg, Berlin, Oxford, 1997, p. 403-425. Online version (German) Online version (English)
- 1999: "What is philosophy?", In Richard Raatzsch (eds): Philosophieren über Philosophie. Leipziger Universitätsverlag, Leipzig, 1999, p. 36-58. Online version
- 2007: "Freedom of will, agency and chance", in Hans-Peter Krüger (eds): Hirn als Subjekt? Philosophische Grenzfragen der Neurobiologie. Academy, Berlin, pp 305–348. Online version
- 2007: "Immediate self consciousness: What is it made of and how it may have evolved.", In: Michael Pauen, Michael Schuette, Alexander Staudacher (eds): Begriff, Erklärung, Bewusstsein. Neue Beiträge zum Qualia-Problem. Mentis, Paderborn, 2007, p. 273-305.
- 2008: "Mental causation and mereological explanations. A simple solution to a complex problem.", In: Deutsche Zeitschrift für Philosophie, forthcoming.
