= Political voluntarism =

Political voluntarism may refer to

- Political voluntarism, the political facet of philosophical voluntarism, holding that political authority emanates from a will
- Voluntaryism, a libertarian philosophy which holds that all forms of human association should be voluntary
