= Voluntarism (philosophy) =

Doctrine prioritizing will over intellect

Voluntarism is "any metaphysical or psychological system that assigns to the will (Latin: voluntas) a more predominant role than that attributed to the intellect", or equivalently "the doctrine that will is the basic factor, both in the universe and in human conduct". Voluntarism has appeared at various points throughout the history of philosophy, seeing application in the areas of metaphysics, psychology, political philosophy and theology. The term voluntarism was introduced by Ferdinand Tönnies into the philosophical literature and particularly used by Wilhelm Wundt and Friedrich Paulsen.

In the context of socialist thought, voluntarism is the use of human will and effort to overcome material limitations to advance development in the absence of advanced technology and economic resources.

== Theological voluntarism ==
=== Medieval theological voluntarism ===
Associated with Duns Scotus and William of Ockham, medieval theological voluntarism (not to be confused with meta-ethical theological voluntarism) is generally taken to be the philosophical emphasis on the divine will and human freedom over and above the intellect (voluntas superior intellectu). For example, Scotus held that morality comes from God's will and choice rather than his intellect or knowledge. Accordingly, God should be defined as an omnipotent being whose actions should not and cannot be ultimately rationalized and explained through reason. As such, voluntarism is usually contrasted with intellectualism, championed by the scholastic Thomas Aquinas.

=== Theological voluntarism as an approach to natural philosophy ===
Theological voluntarism also refers to theological commitments—that is, specific interpretations of doctrines of Christianity—arguably held by certain early modern natural philosophers such as Pierre Gassendi, Walter Charleton, Robert Boyle, Isaac Barrow and Isaac Newton. It resulted in an empirical approach associated with early modern science. Voluntarism therefore allows that faith or belief in God can be achieved by will as opposed to requiring a prior divine gift of faith to the individual. This notion holds at least in so far as it has found favor among some historians and philosophers (e.g. the historian Francis Oakley and the philosopher Michael B. Foster). A 20th-century theologian of voluntarism was James Luther Adams.

== Metaphysical voluntarism ==
A proponent of metaphysical voluntarism is 19th-century German philosopher Arthur Schopenhauer. In his view, the will is not reasoning, but an irrational, unconscious urge in relation to which the intellect represents a secondary phenomenon. The will is actually the force at the core of all reality. This putting out of the drive–intention–vital dynamics later influenced Friedrich Nietzsche (will to power), Philipp Mainländer (will to die), Eduard von Hartmann, Julius Bahnsen and Sigmund Freud (will to pleasure).

== Epistemological voluntarism ==
In epistemology, epistemological voluntarism is the view that belief is a matter of the will rather than one of simply registering one's cognitive attitude or degree of psychological certainty with respect to a stated proposition. If one is a voluntarist with respect to beliefs, it is coherent to simultaneously feel very certain about a particular proposition P and assign P a very low subjective probability. This is the basis of Bas van Fraassen's reflection principle. See also: Doxastic voluntarism.

== Political voluntarism ==
Political voluntarism, or voluntaryism, is the view that understands political authority to be will-based. This view which was propounded by theorists like Thomas Hobbes, Jean-Jacques Rousseau and many members of the German idealist tradition understands political authority as emanating from a will.

== In socialism ==
=== Marxism ===
In Marxist discourse, voluntarism was used to designate a connection between a philosophical commitment to metaphysical voluntarism (especially Machism) and a political commitment to extreme revolutionary tactics, particularly associated with Alexander Bogdanov.

The Soviet Union promoted shock work during the First Five-Year Plan period in an effort to increase productivity through human effort in the absence of more developed machinery.

In Mao Zedong's view of voluntarism, personal effort could expedite the progress of history.

The Cuban Revolutionary Offensive sought to encourage voluntary labor in the countryside both to accelerate development of the socialist economy and to encourage the development of the socialist New Man ethos.

=== Other socialist thought ===
As part of his view of ujamaa as an African socialism, Tanzanian President Julius Nyerere contended that socialist subjectivity could itself be a force for economic development. Nyerere stated that "the people, and the people alone are the motive force in the making of world history[,]" rather than technological capacity or historical logic.

== Critical voluntarism ==
Hugo Dingler's critical voluntarism in the philosophy of science is a form of conventionalism which posits that theorizing in the sciences starts with an unavoidable free decision of the will. The successor school of Dingler's critical voluntarism is the methodical constructivism of the Erlangen School (cf. also the methodical culturalism of the Marburg School).

== See also ==
- Conatus
- Free will
- Voluntarism (psychology)
