= Thought collective =

A thought collective, a term originated in German as "Denkkollektiv" by the Polish and Israeli physician Ludwik Fleck, is a community of researchers who interact collectively towards the production or elaboration of knowledge using a shared framework of cultural customs and knowledge acquisition.

In Fleck (1935), Fleck identified the scientific production of knowledge as primarily a social process that hinges upon prior discoveries and practices in a way that constrains and preconditions new ideas and concepts. He termed this shared collection of preexisting knowledge a "Denkstil" or thought style and formulated a comparative epistemology of science using these two ideas.

== Genesis and Development of a Scientific Fact ==
Ludwik Fleck, a Polish and Israeli physician and biologist working during the 20th century, developed an idea of scientific knowledge creation as being primarily a social practice, dependent on the cultural and historical practices within which researchers find themselves. He elaborated this idea with a series of examples in the 1935 essay Entstehung und Entwicklung einer wissenschaftlichen Tatsache, together with a book of the same name, however, his ideas went largely unnoticed until Thomas Kuhn's rediscovery of them in the 1960s. (Note: Harwood claims different, writing: "After the war it languished in obscurity, despite Kuhn's passing reference to it in The Structure of Scientific Revolutions, until a German scholar rediscovered it in the early 1970s." He credits W. Baldamus, The Role of Discoveries in Social Science (1972)) Within the text, Fleck uses the identification of syphilis in the late-1800s and early-1900s as an example of a scientific fact that was supremely conditioned by the historical and social context in which it was discovered. Fleck likens the statement that a scientific fact has been ascertained, to a statement of the type "'someone recognizes something,'" a statement which is meaningless without further context. He continues the example to state that just as the sentence "'Town A is situated to the left of town B'" is incomplete without an observational reference frame, such as "'to someone walking on the road from town C to town B,'" so too is a scientific discovery incomplete without considerations of the social practices that condition it.

Fleck's goal for this discussion was to situate the discovery of new scientific facts, a form of epistemological cognition, within the greater environment of knowledge that encompasses them. He promotes with the idea of the "Denkkollektiv" the tenet that any discovery is an interaction between at least three things, namely the discovered phenomenon, the discoverer, and the existing pool of knowledge from which they draw. By interacting socially in their production of knowledge, researchers produce common concepts and practices that they use to discuss and debate one another's ideas and discoveries. These common concepts and practices both provide a shared language of science within which they can communicate, and consequently limit the possibilities of thought that the researchers can have. Under the influence of a particular "thought style," the common concepts and practices previously mentioned, a community of researchers "shares joint attributes of problems and judgments considered as evident, joint methods to acquire knowledge, and agrees in the determination of meaningless questions." Within this conception of the production of scientific knowledge, the ideas, concepts, and theories of these researchers are permanently conditioned by their present "thought style" and cannot be considered independently of them.

As a result of his formulation of the thought style and thought collective concepts, Fleck attempted to situate the individual scientific discoverer within the system of individuals that compromise the community of interacting researchers. To this end, he maintained that the individual's only contribution to the production of new knowledge is the determination of results that follow from established conceptual preconditions. As he states, "the preconditions correspond to active linkages and constitute that portion of cognition belonging to the collective." The ascertaining of scientific knowledge as such is a result of connections between concepts and ideas that are laid out by the community of researchers, laying the groundwork from which individual researchers can draw their conclusions. Just as a soccer player makes little progress in a game without their interactions among a cooperating team, an individual researcher is lost without the thought collective that shapes their approach to scientific practice. Extending this analogy, ideas and concepts exchange between individuals in the thought collective like passes in a soccer match, each time gaining new directions and a change in momentum. With the greater collective and style of practice taken into account, scientific discoveries can be considered as communal social products influenced by the particular milieu that surrounds them.
