= Peter Janich =

German philosopher (1942–2016)

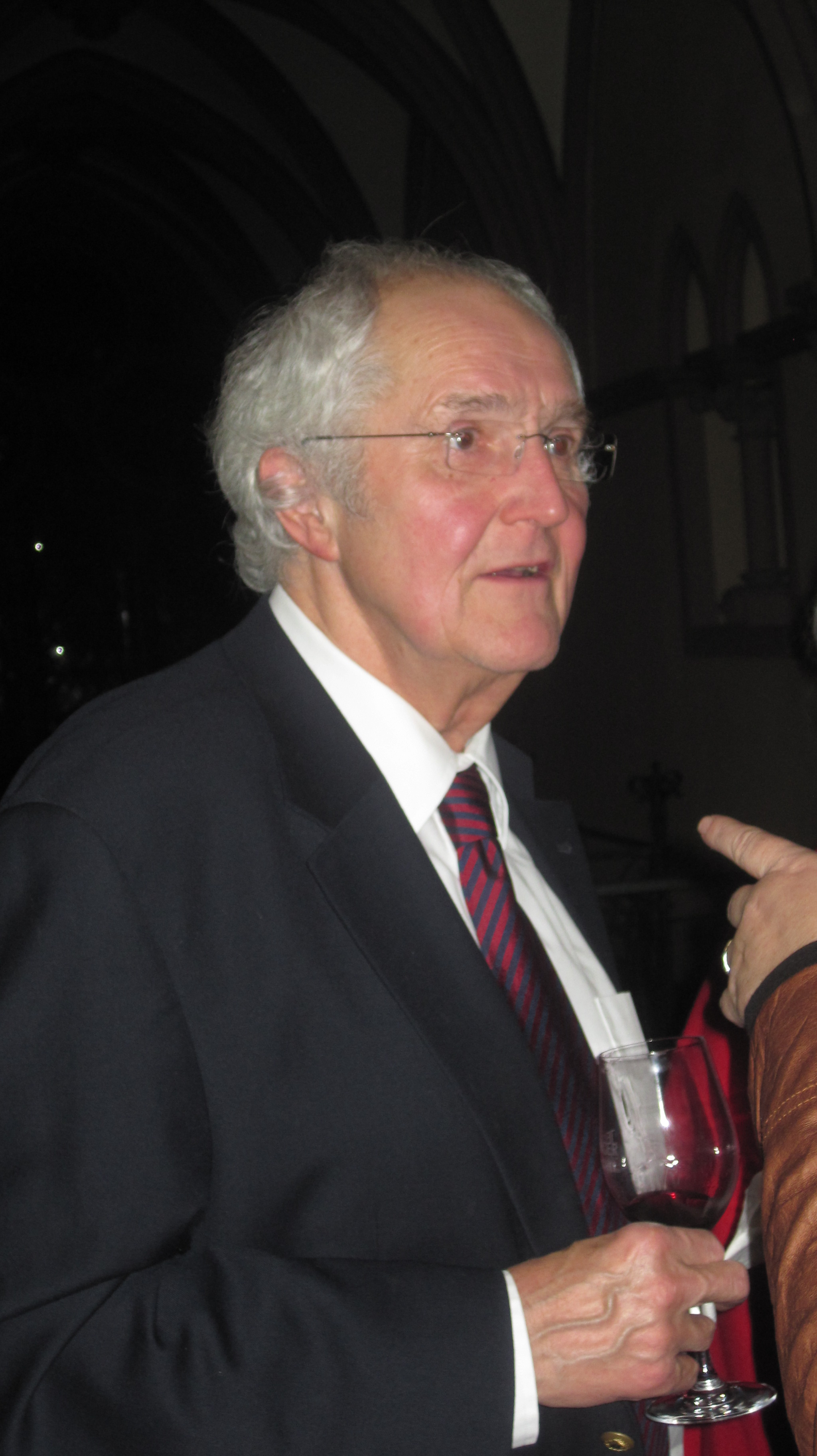
Peter Janich in 2011

Peter Janich (4 January 1942 – 4 September 2016) was a professor of philosophy at the University of Marburg.

He was born in Munich. Janich studied physics, philosophy and psychology at the Universities of Erlangen and Hamburg. He attained a doctorate in philosophy in 1969 and during 1969/70 was a guest lecturer at the University of Texas at Austin. From 1973 to 1980 he was a professor for philosophy of science of exact sciences at the University of Konstanz. Since 1980 he has held the chair for systematic philosophy with an emphasis on theoretical philosophy at the Philipps University of Marburg.

Janich is the joint founder and representative of the approach of methodical culturalism, a development of the methodical constructivism of the Erlangen School of constructivism. He developed the concept of protophysics with Paul Lorenzen and Rüdiger Inhetveen. Janich died of cancer at the age of 74 on 4 September 2016 in Rauschenberg.
