= How We Think =

Book written by John dewey

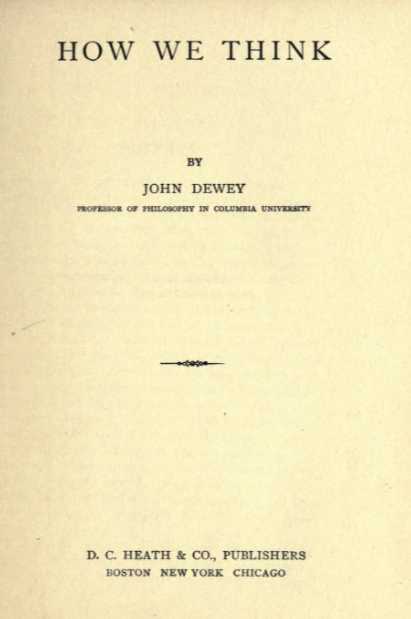
- Title page for How We Think (1910)
- Author: John Dewey
- Publication date: 1910
- Text: How We Think at Wikisource

How We Think is a book written by the American educational philosopher John Dewey, published in 1910. It was reissued in a substantially revised edition in 1933.

The original version has 14 chapters and opens with the words:

No words are oftener on our lips than thinking and thought. So profuse and varied, indeed, is our use of these words that it is not easy to define just what we mean by them.

Chapter 1 is then concerned with establishing a "single consistent meaning" for "thinking" and "thought".
