= Methodical culturalism =

Theory of knowledge generation

Methodical culturalism is a philosophical approach developed by Peter Janich and his pupils. Its core statement is that science is not developed from purely theoretical considerations, but as a development of everyday, proto-scientific human behavior—in other words, that science is a stylized form of everyday knowledge-forming practice.

Thus, from the viewpoint of methodical culturalism, science is understood as a continuation of the practical processes of the everyday world and must be analyzed from this aspect systematically and methodically.

Methodical culturalism is a development of the methodical constructivism of the Erlangen School of constructivism.

== See also ==
- Action theory
- Constructivist epistemology
