= Paul Lorenzen =

German mathematician and philosopher (1915–1994)

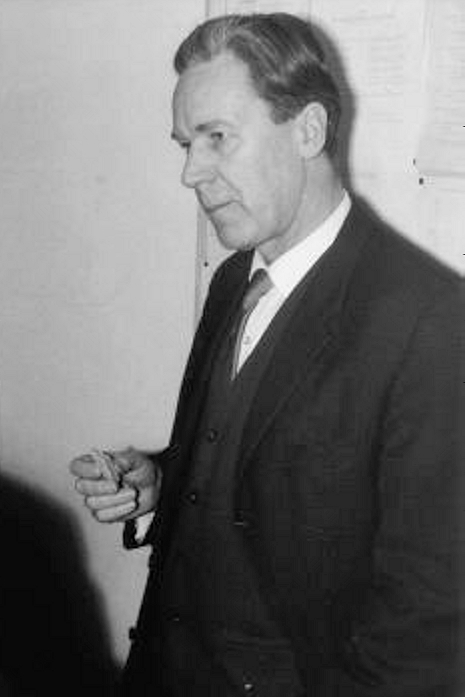
- Born: March 24, 1915; Kiel, German Empire
- Died: October 1, 1994 (aged 79); Göttingen, Germany
- Scientific career
- Fields: Philosophy, mathematics
- Doctoral advisor: Helmut Hasse

Paul Lorenzen (March 24, 1915 – October 1, 1994) was a German philosopher and mathematician, founder of the Erlangen School (with Wilhelm Kamlah) and inventor of game semantics (with Kuno Lorenz).

== Biography ==
Lorenzen studied at the University of Göttingen until he earned his PhD there in 1938 under Helmut Hasse with a thesis titled Zur Abstrakten Begründung der multiplikativen Idealtheorie. In 1933, he joined the SA and the German Nazionalist Studenti Union (NSDStB), while, four years later, he became a member of the Nazi Party. In early 1940 he was drafted into the Army. Through Hasse's mediation, Lorenzen worked with Wilhelm Tranow from July 1940 to April 1941 on the Bavy's decoding project.

In 1939, he became an assistant to Wolfgang Krull at the University of Bonn, where he officially remained until 1949. His main work was on the foundations of mathematics—proof theory. He created and modified constructive mathematics. Lorenzen taught at Stanford, the University of Texas, and Boston University in the USA. He was John Locke Lecturer in 1967/1968.

== Theory ==
Lorenzen came in 1962 to University of Erlangen (South Germany) and founded the Erlangen School of epistemological constructivism there.

He wrote with Wilhelm Kamlah the famous book Logical Propaedeutic ("Logische Propädeutik") and worked on game semantics (Dialogische Logik) with Kuno Lorenz. With Peter Janich he invented protophysics of time and space. He developed constructive logic, constructive type theory and constructive analysis.

Lorenzen's work on calculus Differential and Integral was dedicated to Hermann Weyl. Lorenzen used Weyl's technique to develop a predicative analysis, which can reconstruct classical analysis, without the principle of excluded middle or the axiom of choice. He worked also on Gerhard Gentzen's cut elimination to find a way to continue Hilbert's program after the results of Gödel.

In the theory of geometry and physics, Lorenzen was influenced by Hugo Dingler. He followed Dingler in building up geometry and physics out of primitive operations. Lorenzen took an early interpretation of Steven Weinberg (Gravitation and Cosmology, 1972) for his doubts about geometrical elements of general relativity, believing that Maxwell's equations are to be modified by general relativity instead.

Lorenzen was also influenced by Wilhelm Dilthey's hermeneutics, and liked to quote Dilthey's saying that knowledge cannot go behind life. Dilthey's Lebensphilosophie was the description of the setting in ordinary experience in which we construct the abstractions of mathematics and physics.

As John Locke Lecturer he invented normative logic as a base on ethics and political argumentation.

== Major works ==
- Paul Lorenzen, Frederick J. Crosson (Translator), Formal Logic, Springer, New York, July 1964.
- Paul Lorenzen, Normative Logic and Ethics, Mannheim/Zürich, 1969.
- Paul Lorenzen, John Bacon (Translator), Differential and Integral: A constructive introduction to classical analysis, The University of Texas Press, Austin, 1971.
- Paul Lorenzen, Lehrbuch der konstruktiven Wissenschaftstheorie, Mannheim/Zürich, 1984.
- Paul Lorenzen, Karl Richard Pavlovic (Translator), Constructive Philosophy, The University of Massachusetts Press, Amherst, 1987.
