= Richard Raatzsch =

German philosopher (born 1957)

Richard Raatzsch (born 1957 in Halle an der Saale, East Germany) is a German philosopher. Since 2008, he has been Chair of Ethics within the European Business School (EBS) at Reichartshausen Castle in Oestrich-Winkel/Rheingau (Germany).

== Life ==
Raatzsch studied philosophy and history at Martin-Luther-Universität Halle-Wittenberg (then East Germany). After earning his Ph.D. at that institution, he pursued a teaching and research career at the University of Leipzig, first at the Institute for Logic and Philosophy of Science ("Institut für Logik und Wissenschaftstheorie"), and subsequently at the Institute for Philosophy ("Institut für Philosophie"). In 1999, he earned the habilitation degree for a study of Ludwig Wittgenstein's Philosophical Investigations; the study was published in book form under the title Eigentlich Seltsames. Wittgensteins Philosophische Untersuchungen. Ein Kommentar (Something Strange. Wittgenstein's Philosophical Investigations. A Commentary) in 2003.

In 2004, Raatzsch served as Chair of Political Philosophy and Philosophical Anthropology at the University of Potsdam (Germany). He also taught at the University of St Gallen (Switzerland) and University of Bergen (Norway). From 2006 to 2008, a Heisenberg Grant enabled him to do research at Cambridge University (UK); since then, he has been a "life member" of Clare Hall College Cambridge (UK). From 1996 on, Raatzsch has been editor of the international periodical Wittgenstein Studies.

== Major research areas ==
- Philosophy of Language
- Philosophy of Mind
- Metaphilosophy
- Ethics
- Political Philosophy

== Books ==
- Philosophiephilosophie [Philosophy of Philosophy]. Reclam, Stuttgart 2000
- Eigentlich Seltsames. Wittgensteins Philosophische Untersuchungen. Ein Kommentar [Something Strange. Wittgenstein's Philosophical Investigations. A Commentary]. Vol. 1: Einleitung und Kommentar PU 1-64. Schöningh, Paderborn – Munich – Zurich 2003
- Autorität und Autonomie [Authority and Autonomy]. mentis, Paderborn 2007
- Apologizing Evil: Iago's Case. Princeton University Press, Princeton – Oxford 2009

== Essays ==
- PI 1 – Setting the Stage. In: Grazer Philosophische Studien 51 (1996), p. 47–84.
- Über Wesen und Wert der Vorurteile. In: Deutsche Zeitschrift für Philosophie 50 (2002), p. 646–653.
- Intending to Act Intentionally. In: conceptus 35 (2002/03), S. 103–108.
- Das Wesen der Welt sichtbar machen. In: Deutsche Zeitschrift für Philosophie 52 (2004), p. 445–465.
- On Knowing what One Does. In: Grazer Philosophische Studien 61 (2006), p. 251–283.
