= Kuno Lorenz =

German philosopher (born 1932)

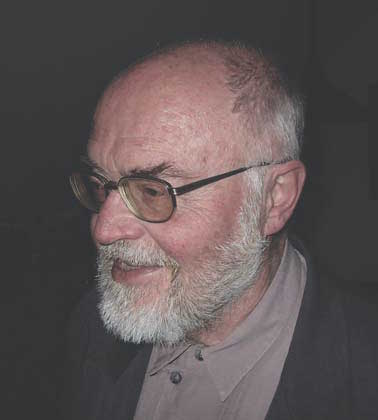
Kuno Lorenz

Kuno Lorenz (born September 17, 1932 in Vachdorf, Thüringen) is a German philosopher. He developed a philosophy of dialogue, in connection with the pragmatic theory of action of the Erlangen constructivist school. Lorenz is married to the literary scholar Karin Lorenz-Lindemann.

== Career ==
After studying mathematics and physics in Tübingen, Hamburg, Bonn and Princeton, Lorenz earned his Ph.D. in 1961 under Paul Lorenzen in Kiel with a thesis about Arithmetic and Logic as Games. In 1969 he received his habilitation degree in philosophy also under Lorenzen but this time in Erlangen. In 1970 he was offered the chair of philosophy at the University of Hamburg to succeed Carl Friedrich von Weizsäcker. From 1974 till his retirement in 1997 he taught at the University of Saarland in Saarbrücken. Among his former students is Arno Ros.

== Dialogue and predication ==
Lorenz developed (along with Paul Lorenzen) an approach to arithmetic and logic as dialogue games. In dialogical logic (game semantics), tree calculations (generally, of a Gentzen-type calculus) are written upside down, so that the initial assertion of a proponent stays above and is defended against an opponent as in a game. This is a linguistically more congenial approach to logic, which is more suitable as a model for argumentation than the formal derivation in a calculus or truth tables. Lorenz presented for the first time a simple demonstration of Gentzen's consistency proof on this game-theoretic basis. If one regards logic and mathematics in this way as a game, an intuitionist approach becomes a more plausible option.

== Dialogical constructivism ==
Not only logic, but the whole of philosophy is given a dialogical treatment by Lorenz. Only in the mirror of a relative Other is it possible to reflect upon oneself. Lorenz developed a dialogical constructivism from the focus on the dialogical principle (Martin Buber) and the process of language games of the later Ludwig Wittgenstein. In addition, the pragmatism of Charles Sanders Peirce and the historicism of Wilhelm Dilthey are complementarily juxtaposed.

== Publications ==
- —; Mittelstraß, Jürgen (1969). "Die methodische Philosophie Hugo Dinglers | Einleitung zum Nachdruck von". Hugo Dingler Die Ergreifung des Wirklichen Kapitel I-IV. Reihe Theorie 1 (in German). Frankfurt: Suhrkamp. pp. 7–55.
- — (1970). Elemente der Sprachkritik. Eine Alternative zum Dogmatismus und Skeptizismus in der Analytischen Philosophie. Reihe Theorie (in German). Frankfurt: Suhrkamp.
- — (1977). "Einführung zu". Richard Gätschenberger Zeichen, die Fundamente des Wissens. problemata (in German). Vol. 59 (Zweite, unveränd. Aufl., vermehrt um eine Einführung von Kuno Lorenz Lorenz. (Nachdr. v. 1932) ed.). Stuttgart: frommann-holzboog.
- —; Lorenzen, Paul (1978). Dialogische Logik (in German). Darmstadt: WBG.
- —, ed. (1978). Konstruktionen versus Positionen | Beiträge zur Diskussion um die konstruktive Wissenschaftstheorie. Paul Lorenzen zum 60. Geburtstag (in German). Berlin, New York: de Gruyter.
- — (1980). "Sprachphilosophie". In Althaus u.a. (ed.). Lexikon der germanistischen Linguistik (in German). Tübingen: Niemeyer.
- —, ed. (1982). Identität und Individuation (in German) (2 Bde. ed.). Stuttgart: frommann-holzboog.
- — (1986). "Dialogischer Konstruktivismus". In Salamun, K. (ed.). Was ist Philosophie? (in German). Tübingen: Mohr.
- — (1992) [1990]. Einführung in die philosophische Anthropologie (in German) (2 ed.). Darmstadt: WBG. ISBN 3-534-04879-2.
- —; Gerhardus, Dietfried [in German]; Meggle, Georg [in German], eds. (1992). Sprachphilosophie Ein internationales Handbuch zeitgenössischer Forschung (in German) (2 Halbbde. ed.). Berlin/New York.
- — (1998). Indische Denker (in German). München: Beck. ISBN 3-406-41945-3. ("review".)
- — (2009). Dialogischer Konstruktivismus (in German). Berlin, New York: de Gruyter. ISBN 978-3-11-020310-3.
