= Ludwik Fleck =

Polish physician

- לודוויק פלק
- Born: 11 July 1896; Lemberg, Galicia, Austria-Hungary
- Died: 5 June 1961 (aged 64); Ness Ziona, Israel
- Known for: Contributions to logology Denkstil ("thought style"); Denkkollektiv ("thought collective"); Incommensurability (niewspółmierność)

Academic background
- Education: Jan Kazimierz University
- Influences: Rudolf Weigl

Academic work
- Discipline: Philosophy of science; Sociology of science
- Notable works: Genesis and Development of a Scientific Fact (in German, 1935; in English, 1979)
- Influenced: Thomas Kuhn; Michel Foucault

Ludwik Fleck (Polish: [ˈludvik ˈflɛk]; Hebrew: לודוויק פלק; 11 July 1896 – 5 June 1961) was a Polish and Israeli physician and biologist who did important work in epidemic typhus in Lwów, Poland, with Rudolf Weigl and in the 1930s developed the concepts of "Denkstil" ("thought style") and "Denkkollektiv" ("thought collective").

Fleck's concept of "thought collective" is important in the philosophy of science and in logology (the "science of science"), helping explain how scientific ideas change over time, much as in Thomas Kuhn's later notion of "paradigm shift" (on Fleck's possible influence on Kuhn, see Jarnicki and Greif) and in Michel Foucault's concept of "episteme".

Fleck's account of the development of facts at the intersection of active elements of a thought collective and the passive resistances of nature provides a way of considering the culture of modern science as evolutionary and evidence-oriented.

== Life ==
Ludwik Fleck was born in Lemberg (Lwów in Polish, now L'viv, Ukraine) into a Jewish family and grew up in the cultural autonomy of the Austrian province of Galicia. He graduated from a Polish lyceum (secondary school) in 1914 and enrolled at Lwów's Jan Kazimierz University, where he received his medical degree.

In 1920 he became an assistant to the famous typhus specialist Rudolf Weigl at Jan Kazimierz University. From 1923 to 1935 Fleck worked in the department of internal medicine at Lwów General Hospital, then became director of the bacteriological laboratory at the local social security authority. From 1935 he worked at the private bacteriological laboratory which he had earlier founded.

With Nazi Germany's occupation of Lwów, Fleck was sent with his wife, Ernestina Waldmann, and son Ryszard to the city's Jewish ghetto. He continued his research in the hospital and developed a new procedure in which he procured a vaccine from the urine of typhus patients. Fleck's work was known to the German occupiers, and his family were arrested in December 1942 and sent to the Laokoon pharmaceutical factory to produce a typhus serum. He and his family were arrested again and sent to the Auschwitz concentration camp on 7 February 1943. His task was to diagnose syphilis, typhus, and other illnesses using serological tests. From December 1943 until the liberation of Poland on 11 April 1945, Fleck was detained in Buchenwald concentration camp; there he worked with Marian Ciepielowski to produce a working typhus vaccine for camp inmates, while producing a fake vaccine for the SS.

Between 1945 and 1952, in Lublin, he served as head of the Institute of Microbiology at the Maria Curie-Skłodowska University School of Medicine. In 1952 he moved to Warsaw to become director of the Department of Microbiology and Immunology at the Mother and Child State Institute. In 1954 he was elected a member of the Polish Academy of Sciences. Fleck's research during these years focused on the behavior of leucocytes in infectious and stress situations. Between 1946 and 1957 he published 87 medical and scientific articles in Polish, French, English, and Swiss journals. In 1951 he was awarded the National Prize for Scientific Achievements, and in 1955 the Officer's Cross of the Order of Polonia Restituta.

In 1956, after a heart attack and the discovery that he was suffering from lymphosarcoma, Fleck emigrated to Israel, where a position was created for him at the Israel Institute for Biological Research. He died in 1961, aged 64, of a second heart attack.

The Ludwik Fleck Prize is awarded annually for the best book in the field of science and technology studies. The prize was created in 1992 by the 4S Council (Society for the Social Studies of Science).

== Thought collective ==
Fleck wrote that the development of truth in scientific research was an unattainable ideal, since researchers are locked into thought collectives (or thought-styles). "[P]ure and direct observation cannot exist: in the act of perceiving objects, the observer, i.e. the epistemological subject, is always influenced by the [period] and... environment to which he belongs, that is, by what Fleck calls the thought style."

In Fleck's work, thought style is closely associated with representational style. A "fact" is a relative value, expressed in the language or symbolism of the thought collective in which it belongs, and subject to the collective's social and temporal structure. He argues, however, that within the cultural style of a thought collective, knowledge claims or facts are constrained by passive elements arising from observations and experience of the natural world. The passive resistance of natural experience represented within the stylized means of the thought collective can be verified by anyone adhering to the culture of the thought collective, and thus facts can be agreed upon within a particular thought style.

While a fact may be verifiable within its own collective, it may not be verifiable in other collectives. Fleck felt that the development of scientific facts and concepts is not unidirectional and does not consist only of accumulating new pieces of information, but at times requires changing older concepts, methods of observation, and forms of representation.

This changing of prior knowledge is difficult because a collective acquires a specific way of investigating, which brings with it a blindness to alternative ways of observing and conceptualizing. Change is possible especially when members of two thought collectives meet and cooperate in observing and in formulating hypotheses. Fleck strongly advocated comparative epistemology.

He also noted some features of the culture of modern natural sciences that recognize provisionality and evolution of knowledge along the value of pursuit of passive resistances. This approach anticipated later developments in social constructionism, and especially the development of critical science and technology studies. Kuhn wrote in a foreword to the translation of Fleck's Genesis and development of a scientific fact that he was uncertain how much his earlier readings of Fleck's text had contributed to his The Structure of Scientific Revolutions.

== Honors ==
- 1954: Fleck was inducted as a member of the Polish Academy of Sciences.
- 1955: Fleck was honored with the Officer's Cross of the Order of Polonia Restituta.

== Works ==
=== Translations to English ===
- Genesis and development of a scientific fact (Chicago 1979)

== See also ==
- Cognitive inertia
- List of Polish people (Biology, medicine)

== Sources ==
- Allen, Arthur (2014a). The Fantastic Laboratory of Dr. Weigl: How Two Brave Scientists Battled Typhus and Sabotaged the Nazis. New York: W.W. Norton & Company. ISBN 978-0393081015.
- Allen, Arthur (22 July 2014b). How Scientists Created A Typhus Vaccine in a 'Fantastic Laboratory' (Radio broadcast). NPR books author interviews. Fresh Air. Event occurred at time 3:33 PM ET.
- —— (23 July 2014c). "How a Jewish Doctor Duped the Nazis". Politico.
- Aronova, Elena; Turchetti, Simone, eds. (2016). Science Studies during the Cold War and Beyond: Paradigms Defected. Palgrave Macmillan.
- Cohen, R.S..; Schnelle, T., eds. (1986). "The Problem of Epistemology (1936)". Cognition and Fact: Materials on Ludwik Fleck. Dordrecht: D. Reidel.
- Fleck, Ludwik (1935). Entstehung und Entwicklung einer wissenschaftlichen Tatsache – Einführung in die Lehre vom Denkstil und Denkkollektiv (in German). Basel: Schwabe und Co., Verlagsbuchhandlung. OCLC 257469753.
- —— (1979). Trenn, T.J.; Merton, Robert K.; Kuhn, Thomas Samuel (foreword) (eds.). Genesis and Development of a Scientific Fact. Translated by Bradley, Fred; Trenn, Thaddeus J. Chicago: University of Chicago Press. ISBN 978-0-226-25324-4. "This is the first English translation of Fleck (1935)"
- —— (1983). Schäfer, Lothar; Schnelle, Thomas (eds.). Erfahrung und Tatsache. Gesammelte Aufsätze [Experience and Fact. Collected Essays] (in German). Frankfurt am Main: Suhrkamp Verlag. ISBN 978-3-518-28004-1.
- —— (2011). Werner, Sylwia; Zittel, Claus (eds.). Denkstile und Tatsachen: Gesammelte Schriften und Zeugnisse [Styles of Thought and Facts: Collected Writings and Testimonies] (in German). Frankfurt am Main: Suhrkamp Verlag. p. 682. ISBN 978-3-518-29553-3.
- Jarnicki, Paweł; Greif, Hajo (8 June 2022). "The 'Aristotle Experience' Revisited: Thomas Kuhn Meets Ludwik Fleck on the Road to Structure" (PDF). Archiv für Geschichte der Philosophie. 106 (2): 313–349. doi:10.1515/agph-2020-0160.
- Kuhn, Thomas S. (1970). The Structure of Scientific Revolutions. Enlarged (2nd ed.). University of Chicago Press. ISBN 978-0-226-45803-8. LCCN 70107472.
- Matthäus, Jürgen (2018). Predicting the Holocaust: Jewish Organizations Report from Geneva on the Emergence of the "Final Solution," 1939–1942. Rowman & Littlefirled. ISBN 9781538121689.
- Olesko, Kathryn M. (24 December 2020). "Ludwik Fleck, Alfred Schutz, and Trust in Science: The Public Responsibility of Science Education in Challenging Times". HoST - Journal of History of Science and Technology. 14 (2): 50–72. doi:10.2478/host-2020-0014.
- Sady, Wojciech (8 October 2021). "Ludwik Fleck". In Zalta, Edward N.; Nodelman, Uri (eds.). Stanford Encyclopedia of Philosophy. Metaphysics Research Lab, Stanford University.
- Sciortino, Luca (24 August 2021). "The Emergence of Objectivity: Fleck, Foucault, Kuhn and Hacking". Studies in History and Philosophy of Science. 88 (1): 128–137. Bibcode:2021SHPSA..88..128S. doi:10.1016/j.shpsa.2021.06.005. PMID 34166921.
- —— (2023). History of Rationalities. Ways of Thinking from Vico to Hacking and Beyond. New York: Palgrave McMillan. ISBN 978-3-031-24004-1.
- Siwecka, Sofia (2011). "Genesis and development of the "medical fact". Thought style and scientific evidence in the epistemology of Ludwik Fleck" (PDF). Dialogues in Philosophy, Mental and Neuro Sciences. 4 (2): 37–39.
- Tansey, Tilli (16 July 2014). "Typhus and tyranny". Nature. 511 (7509): 291. doi:10.1038/511291a.
- Zittel, Claus (21 February 2012). "Ludwik Fleck and the concept of Style in the natural sciences". Studies in East European Thought. 64 (1–2): 53–79. doi:10.1007/s11212-012-9160-8. JSTOR 41477749. S2CID 255071311.
