= Commensurability (philosophy of science) =

Scientific concept

Commensurability is a concept in the philosophy of science whereby scientific theories are said to be "commensurable" if scientists can discuss the theories using a shared nomenclature that allows direct comparison of them to determine which one is more valid or useful. On the other hand, theories are incommensurable if they are embedded in starkly contrasting conceptual frameworks whose languages do not overlap sufficiently to permit scientists to directly compare the theories or to cite empirical evidence favoring one theory over the other. Discussed by Ludwik Fleck in the 1930s, and popularized by Thomas Kuhn in the 1960s, the problem of incommensurability results in scientists talking past each other, as it were, while comparison of theories is muddled by confusions about terms, contexts and consequences.

== Introduction of the term ==
In 1962, Thomas Kuhn and Paul Feyerabend both independently introduced the idea of incommensurability to the philosophy of science. In both cases, the concept came from mathematics; in its original sense, it is defined as the absence of a common unit of measurement that would allow a direct and exact measurement of two variables, such as the prediction of the diagonal of a square from the relationship of its sides.

The term commensurability was coined because of a series of problems that both authors found when trying to interpret successive scientific theories. Its implementation is better understood thanks to the critiques that both Kuhn and Feyerabend have made in response to certain theses proposed by followers of the received view of theories. These include the famous thesis on the accumulation of scientific knowledge, which states that the body of scientific knowledge has been increasing with the passage of time. Both Kuhn and Feyerabend reject this thesis, in favor of a model that sees both revolutions and periods of normalcy in the history of science.

Another equally important thesis proposes the existence of a neutral language of comparison which can be used to formulate the empirical consequences of two competing theories. This would allow one to choose the theory with the greatest empirically verified contents or explanatory powers—or the greatest content that is not falsified if the formulation is Popperian.

The idea at the root of this second thesis does not just relate to the existence of said language but also implies at least two further postulates. Firstly, this choice between theories presupposes that they can be intertranslated, for example between theory A and its successor B – and in the case of Popper that B can be deduced from A. Secondly, it is assumed that the choice is always carried out under the same standards of rationality.

In both cases, the concept of incommensurability makes the viability of the thesis impossible. In the first, by showing that certain empirical consequences are lost between successive theories. In the second case, by confirming that it is possible to make a rational choice between theories even when they can not be translated into a neutral language. However, although the reasons for the introduction of these counter arguments, and the criticism from which they arise, are the same, the sense in which the coauthors use them are in no way identical. For this reason the idea of incommensurability will be discussed for each coauthor separately.

== Perspectives ==
=== Feyerabend's perspectives ===
Feyerabend locates incommensurability within a principle from the field of semantics which has the underlying idea that the change in significance in the basic terms of a theory changes the totality of the terms of the new theory, so that there are no empirically common meanings between T and T′.

Feyerabend is credited with coining the modern philosophical sense of "incommensurability", which lays the foundation for much of his philosophy of science. He first presented his notion of incommensurability in 1952 to Karl Popper's London School of Economics seminar and to a gathering of illustrious Wittgensteinians (Elizabeth Anscombe, Peter Geach, H. L. A. Hart and Georg Henrik von Wright) in Anscombe's Oxford flat. Feyerabend argued that frameworks of thought, and thus scientific paradigms, can be incommensurable for three reasons. Briefly put, Feyerabend's notion of incommensurability is as follows:

1. The interpretation of observations is implicitly influenced by theoretical assumptions. It is therefore impossible to describe or evaluate observations independently of theory.
2. Paradigms often have different assumptions about which intellectual and operational scientific methods result in valid scientific knowledge.
3. Paradigms can be based on different assumptions regarding the structure of their domain, which makes it impossible to compare them in a meaningful way. The adoption of a new theory includes and is dependent upon the adoption of new terms. Thus, scientists are using different terms when talking about different theories. Those who hold different, competing theories to be true will be talking over one another, in the sense that they cannot a priori arrive at agreement given two different discourses with two different theoretical language and dictates.

According to Feyerabend, the idea of incommensurability cannot be captured in formal logic, because it is a phenomenon outside of logic's domain.

==== Theories ====
In 1989, Feyerabend presented an idea informed by Popper's critical rationalism whereby "investigation starts with a problem. The problem is the result of a conflict between an expectation and an observation, which, in its turn, is formed by the expectation." (Feyerabend, 1989; pp. 96). Scientific methodology then resolves problems by inventing theories that should be relevant and falsifiable, at least to a greater degree than any other alternative solution. Once an alternative theory is presented the critical phase commences regarding T′ which must answer the following questions: (a) why has theory T been successful up until now and (b) why has it failed. If the new theory T′ answers both questions then T is discarded.

That is, a new theory T′, in order to be an adequate successor to the refuted theory T, must have a collection of additional predictions regarding T (Class A), as well as a collection of successful predictions that coincide to a certain degree with the old theory (Class S). These Class S predictions constitute those parts of the new theory containing new truths, and they therefore exclude a series of consequences of T—the failures in the old theory—which are part of the untrue (false) contents of the new theory (Class F).

Given this model it is possible to construct relational statements between certain terms from T and from T′, which will be the basis for the comparison between the theories. This will allow a choice between the two in the light of their empirical contents. But, if we come across a theory T′ in which Class S is empty then the theories are incommensurable with each other.

However, Feyerabend clarifies this by stating that, incommensurability between T and T′ will depend on the interpretation given to the theories. If this is instrumental, every theory that refers to the same language of observation will be commensurable. In the same way, if a realist perspective is sought then it will favour a unified position which employs the most highly abstracted terms of whatever theory is being considered in order to describe both theories, giving a significance to the observational statements as a function of these terms, or, at least to replace the habitual use they are given.

It can be noted that the instrumentalist interpretation recognizes the existence of certain statements whose truth is not only dependent on the observational statements but also on the evaluation criteria they are subjected to, which are anchored in the theories. For example, to affirm the relational character of longitude, this asseveration can not be decided solely using observational terms. Its truth value, in part, depends on the theory that establishes the sense in which the terms are used. In this case they relate to quantum mechanics (QM) as opposed to classical mechanics (CM). In this sense, the instrumentalist position only deals with the empirical consequences and leaves to one side the relationship that the concepts have with each other.

In this same way Feyerabend comments that:

It is certain, of course, that the relativist scheme has very often given us numbers that are practically identical to the numbers obtained from CM, but this does not mean that the concepts are very similar...[For] even if ...yielding strictly identical predictions can be used as an argument to show that the concepts must match, at least in this case, different magnitudes based on different concepts can give identical values for their respective scales while being different magnitudes...[So] it is not possible to make a comparison of the contents, nor is it possible to make a judgement regarding its verisimilitude.

— Paul Feyerabend

==== Realist objections ====
In relation to realist objections, Feyerabend returns to an argument elaborated by Carnap and comments that the use of such abstract concepts leads to an impossible position, as "...theoretical terms receive their interpretation by being connected with an observational language and those terms are empty without that connection." (Feyerabend, pp. 373). As before it follows that they can not be used to confer significance to the observational language as this observational language is its only source of significance, with which it is not possible to make a translation but only a restatement of the term.

Therefore, Feyerabend considers that both the instrumentalist and the realist interpretations are flawed, as they try to defend the idea that incommensurability is a legitimately unsolvable idea with which to revoke the theses of the accumulation of knowledge and panrationalism in science.

This leads to the following consideration: if each new theory has its own observational basis, within the meaning of the theoretical framework, how can we hope that the observations that are produced could eventually refute it. Furthermore, how can we actually recognize that the new position explains what it is supposed to explain or if it is deviating off into other areas and therefore how can the theories be definitively compared.

Feyerabend's answer to the first consideration lies in noting that the initial terms of a theory depend on the postulates of the theory and their associated grammatical rules, in addition, the predictions derived from the theory also depend on the underlying conditions of the system. Feyerabend doesn't explore the point further, but it can be assumed that if the prediction does not agree with the observation and if we have a high degree of confidence in the description that we have made from the initial conditions than we can be sure that the error must be present in our theory and in its underlying terms.

In dealing with the second consideration Feyerabend asks "why should it be necessary to have a terminology that allows us to say that two theories refer to the same experiment. This supposes a unificationist or possibly a realist aspiration, whose objective appears to be the truth, however, it is assumed that the theory can be compared under a criterion of empirical adequacy. Such an approach would build on the relationship established between the observational statement that describes the outcome of an experiment formulated for each theory independently, which is compared with the predictions that each theory posits. In this way the selection is made when a theory is an empirically better fit. If the objection to the possible deviation of the new theory is not answered it is irrelevant as often history has shown that in fact differing points of view change or modify their fields of application, for example the physics of Aristotle and Newton."

==== Theory selection ====
The above implies that the process of choosing between theories does not obey a universal rationality. Feyerabend has the following view regarding whether the absence of a universal rationality constitutes an irrational position:

No, because each particular episode is rational in the sense that some of its features can be explained in terms of reasons which were either accepted at the time of its occurrence or invented in the course of its development. Yes, because even these local reasons which change from age to age are never sufficient to explain all the important features of a particular episode.

— Paul Feyerabend

Feyerabend uses this reasoning to try to shed light on one of Popper's arguments, which says that we are always able to change any statement, even those reference systems that guide our critical thinking. However, the two thinkers reach different conclusions, Popper assumes that it is always possible to make a criticism once the new criteria have been accepted, so the selection can be seen as the result of a rationality "a posteriori" to the selection. While, Feyerabend's position is that this solution is merely a verbal ornament whenever the standards are influenced by Popper's first world, the physical world, and they are not just developed in the third world. That is, the standards are influenced by the expectations of their originators, the stances they imply and the ways of interpreting the world they favour, but this is strictly analogous to the same process of the scientific revolution, that leads us to believe that the thesis of incommensurability can also be applied to standards, as is shown by the following asseveration:

Even the most puritanical rationalist will then be forced to stop reasoning and to use propaganda and coercion, not because some of his reasons have ceased to be valid, but because the psychological conditions which make them effective, and capable of influencing others, have disappeared. And what is the use of an argument that leaves people unmoved?

— Paul Feyerabend

Feyerabend states that the Popperian criticism is either related to certain clearly defined procedures, or is totally abstract and leaves others with the task of fleshing it out later with specific contents, making Popper's rationality a "mere verbal ornament". This does not imply that Feyerabend is an irrationalist but that he considers that the process of scientific change can not be explained in its totality in the light of some rationality, precisely because of incommensurability.

=== Kuhn's perspectives ===
The second coauthor of the thesis of incommensurability is Thomas Kuhn, who introduced it in his 1962 book, The Structure of Scientific Revolutions, in which he describes it as a universal property that defines the relationship between successive paradigms. Under this meaning incommensurability goes beyond the field of semantics and covers everything relating to its practical application, from the study of problems to the associated methods and rules for their resolution. However, the meaning of the term was continually refined throughout Kuhn's work, he first placed it within the field of semantics and applied a narrow definition, but later he redefined it in a taxonomic sense, wherein changes are found in the relationships between similarities and differences that the subjects of a defining matrix draw over the world.

In The Structure of Scientific Revolutions Kuhn wrote that "the historian of science may be tempted to exclaim that when paradigms change, the world itself changes with them". According to Kuhn, the proponents of different scientific paradigms cannot fully appreciate or understand the other's point of view because they are, as a way of speaking, living in different worlds. Kuhn gave three reasons for this inability:

1. Proponents of competing paradigms have different ideas about the importance of solving various scientific problems, and about the standards that a solution should satisfy.
2. The vocabulary and problem-solving methods that the paradigms use can be different: the proponents of competing paradigms utilize a different conceptual network.
3. The proponents of different paradigms see the world in a different way because of their scientific training and prior experience in research.

In a postscript (1969) to The Structure of Scientific Revolutions, Kuhn added that he thought that incommensurability was, at least in part, a consequence of the role of similarity sets in normal science. Competing paradigms group concepts in different ways, with different similarity relations. According to Kuhn, this causes fundamental problems in communication between proponents of different paradigms. It is difficult to change such categories in one's mind, because the groups have been learned by means of exemplars instead of definitions. This problem cannot be resolved by using a neutral language for communication, according to Kuhn, since the difference occurs prior to the application of language.

Kuhn's thinking on incommensurability was probably in some part influenced by his reading of Michael Polanyi who held that there can be a logical gap between belief systems and who also said that scientists from different schools, "think differently, speak a different language, live in a different world".

==== Phases ====
Given his changing definition of incommensurability Pérez Ransanz has identified three phases in Kuhn's work, or at least in how it deals with this concept. As we have seen above the first phase was seen in The Structure of Scientific Revolutions and it is characterized by an overall vision that is applied to paradigms. This perspective was replaced in the 1970s by a localist and semanticist vision in which incommensurability is now defined as the relationship between two theories that are articulated in two languages that are not completely interchangeable, as Kuhn states in the following extract:

The phrase "without common measure" is converted into "without common language". To state that two theories are incommensurable means that there is no neutral language, or other type of language, into which both theories, conceived as sets of statements, can be translated without remainder or loss... [Although] the majority of the terms shared by the two theories function in the same way in both...

— Thomas Kuhn

The above only prohibits one type of comparison, that which is carried out between the statements of these two theories in a one-to-one relationship. An idea that underlies this formulation is that translation implies symmetry and transitivity so that if theory T is translatable with theory T′, then T′ can be translated to T, and furthermore if there is a third theory T″ and this can be translated to T′, then theories T and T′ cannot be incommensurable, as long as the transitive relationship and the symmetrical relationship assures that their statements can be compared one to another.

Kuhn did not deny that two incommensurable theories may have a common reference environment and in this sense he did not state that it was impossible to compare them, his thesis solely refers to the ability to translate the statements belonging to two theories in a one-to-one relationship, as is shown in the following passage:

The terms that retain their meanings following a change in theory provide a suitable base for the discussion of the differences and for the comparisons that are relevant in the selection of theories. [Continued in a footnote] It may be noted that these terms are not independent of the theory, but they are simply used in the same way in the two theories in question. It follows that the comparison is a process that compares the two theories, it is not a process that can evaluate the theories separately.

— Thomas Kuhn

This is relevant because it allow us to elucidate that Kuhn's sense of rationality is linked to the ability to comprehend, and not to the same capacity for translation.

In the third stage of Kuhn's work the formulation of the thesis of incommensurability became refined in taxonomic terms and is explained as a function of the change in the relations of similarity and difference between two theories. Kuhn declared that this change relates to the concepts of Class A not only because there is a change in the way of referring to the concepts but also because their underlying structure becomes altered, that is, the meaning changes – its intention – but also its reference. In this way Kuhn states that not all of the semantic changes are changes that lead to incommensurability, they are only those that, by being made in the basic categories, operate in a holistic manner meaning that all the relationships between these terms becomes altered. This uses taxonomic terms to define incommensurability as the impossibility to prove the taxonomic structures of two theories, an impossibility that is expressed as a necessarily incomplete translation of the terms.

==== Taxonomic characterization ====
Taxonomic characterization allowed Kuhn to postulate his no-overlap principle, since, if the taxonomic categories are divisions in a logical sense then this implies that the relations established between these concepts and the rest are necessarily hierarchical. It is for exactly this type of relationship that the changes in categories are holistic, as the modification of a category necessarily implies the modification of the surrounding categories, which explains why once the change takes place the taxonomies can not be comparable – they are isomorphic.

This characterization was already present in Kuhn's writing along with remnants of semantic characterization, which he developed in full towards the end of the 1980s in his taxonomic characterization. An advantage of this characterization is the belief that the criteria that allow the identification of a concept with its references are many and varied, so that a coincidence of criteria is not necessary for successful communication except for those categories that are implicated. Kuhn saw the relations between concepts as existing in a multidimensional space, the categories consist of partitions in this space and they must coincide between the communicators, although this is not the case for the criteria that establish a connection between this space and the associated reference.

==== Reluctance ====
An important clarification that should be made, and which constantly appears in Kuhn's writing, is his reluctance to equate translation and interpretation, a comparison that Kuhn attributes to the analytical tradition of philosophy. Translation is an almost mechanical activity which produces a Quinean translation manual that relates sequences of words in such a way that their truth values are conserved. However, the process of interpretation implies the development of translation hypotheses, which have to be successful when they allow external preferences to be understood in a coherent and meaningful way. Kuhn then rejected the idea of a universal translatability but not the principle of universal intelligibility, a distinction that is very important in understanding Kuhn's rejection of his critics, such as Popper and Davidson.

However, without a doubt the previous idea invites us to question how is it that we are able to interpret in the first place. Kuhn's solution consists in affirming that this is like learning a new language. How is it that we are able to learn a new language when we are confronted with a holistic change such as is implied by the notion of incommensurability? Kuhn's work suggests four aspects to this question:

- Firstly, in order to carry out such an assimilation it is necessary that the complementary vocabulary is easily understood.
- Secondly, definitions must fulfill a minimal role, it is the paradigmatic examples that introduce the use of the new concepts, in such a way that an ostensive or stipulative component is essential.
- Thirdly, class concepts cannot be learned in isolation, but in relation to a series of contrast sets.
- Fourthly, the process of learning involves the generation of expectations, which are the basis of the projectability of the class terms, in such a way that in their turn they form the basis of, among other things, inductive inferences. And lastly, as the criteria for relating the class and its reference vary, this forms the way of learning the subject matter.

=== Conclusion ===
It can be concluded that Kuhn's idea of incommensurability, despite its various reformulations, manages to seriously problematize both the idea of accumulation of a neutral language as well as of the very idea of a neutral language, without falling into irrationalism nor stating that the common reference level is irrelevant. An idea that differentiates him from Feyerabend who states in books such as Problems of Empiricism and Against Method that if the new theory deviates into new areas, this is not a problem of the theory, as often the conceptual progress leads to the disappearance and not to the refutation or resolution of the old questions.

== Meta-incommensurability ==
A more general notion of incommensurability has been applied to the sciences at the meta-level in two significant ways.

Eric Oberheim and Paul Hoyningen-Huene argue that realist and anti-realist philosophies of science are also incommensurable; thus, scientific theories themselves may be meta-incommensurable.

Similarly, Nicholas Best describes a different type of incommensurability between philosophical theories of meaning. He argues that if the meaning of a first-order scientific theory depends on its second-order theory of meaning, then two first order theories will be meta-incommensurable if they depend on substantially different theories of meaning. Whereas Kuhn and Feyerabend's concepts of incommensurability do not imply complete incomparability of scientific concepts, this incommensurability of meaning does.

== Bibliography ==
=== Primary bibliography ===
- Feyerabend, Paul K. (1970). Problems of Empiricism. UK: Cambridge University Press. ISBN 978-0-521-31641-5.
- Feyerabend, Paul K. (1999). For and against the method. America: University of Chicago Press. ISBN 978-0-226-46774-0.
- Kuhn, Thomas S. (2000). The Road Since Structure. America: University of Chicago Press. ISBN 978-0-226-45798-7.
  - Kuhn, Thomas S. (2000). "What are Scientific Revolutions?". The Road Since Structure. America: University of Chicago Press. ISBN 978-0-226-45798-7.
  - Kuhn, Thomas S. (2000). "Commensurability, Comparability, Communicability". The Road Since Structure. America: University of Chicago Press. ISBN 978-0-226-45798-7.
- Popper, Karl R. (1996). The Myth of the Framework. UK: Routledge. ISBN 978-0-415-13555-9.
- Davidson, Donald (2001). Inquiries into truth and interpretation. UK: Oxford University Press. ISBN 978-0-19-924629-8.
  - Davidson, Donald (2001). "Belief and the basis of meaning". Inquiries into truth and interpretation. UK: Oxford University Press. ISBN 978-0-19-924629-8.
  - Davidson, Donald (2001). "Radical interpretation". Inquiries into truth and interpretation. UK: Oxford University Press. ISBN 978-0-19-924629-8.
  - Davidson, Donald (2001). "Truth and Meaning". Inquiries into truth and interpretation. UK: Oxford University Press. ISBN 978-0-19-924629-8.

=== Secondary bibliography ===
- Forster, Malcolm R. (2000). "Hard Problems in the philosophy of science: Idealization and commensurability". After Popper, Kuhn & Feyerabend: Issues in Theories of Scientific Method. Kluwer: Australasian Studies in History and Philosophy of Science.
- Fu, Daiwie (1993). "Problem Domain, Taxonomy and Comparativity in Histories of Science". Philosophy and Conceptual History of Science in Taiwan. Taiwan: Springer. ISBN 978-0-7923-1766-1.
- Galison, Peter (1997). "Trading Zone: Coordinating Action and Belief". Image and Logic: A Material Culture of Microphysics. America: University of Chicago Press. ISBN 978-0-226-27916-9.
- Mitchell, Sandra (2003). Biological Complexity and Integrative Pluralism. UK: Cambridge University Press. ISBN 978-0-521-52079-9.
- Rizzuto, Ana (2004). The Dynamics of Human Aggression. UK: Routledge. ISBN 978-0-415-94591-2.
