= Research program =

Professional network conducting research

A research program (British English: research programme) is a professional network of scientists conducting basic research. The term was used by philosopher of science Imre Lakatos to blend and revise the normative model of science offered by Karl Popper's The Logic of Scientific Discovery (with its idea of falsifiability) and the descriptive model of science offered by Thomas Kuhn's The Structure of Scientific Revolutions (with its ideas of normal science and paradigm shifts). Lakatos found falsificationism impractical and often not practiced, and found normal science—where a paradigm of science, mimicking an exemplar, extinguishes differing perspectives—more monopolistic than actual.

Lakatos found that many research programs coexisted. Each had a hard core of theories immune to revision, surrounded by a protective belt of malleable theories. A research programme vies against others to be most progressive. Extending the research program's theories into new domains is theoretical progress, and experimentally corroborating such is empirical progress, always refusing falsification of the research program's hard core. A research program might degenerate—lose progressiveness—but later return to progressiveness.
