= Copernican heliocentrism =

Heliostatic model of solar system by Nicolaus Copernicus

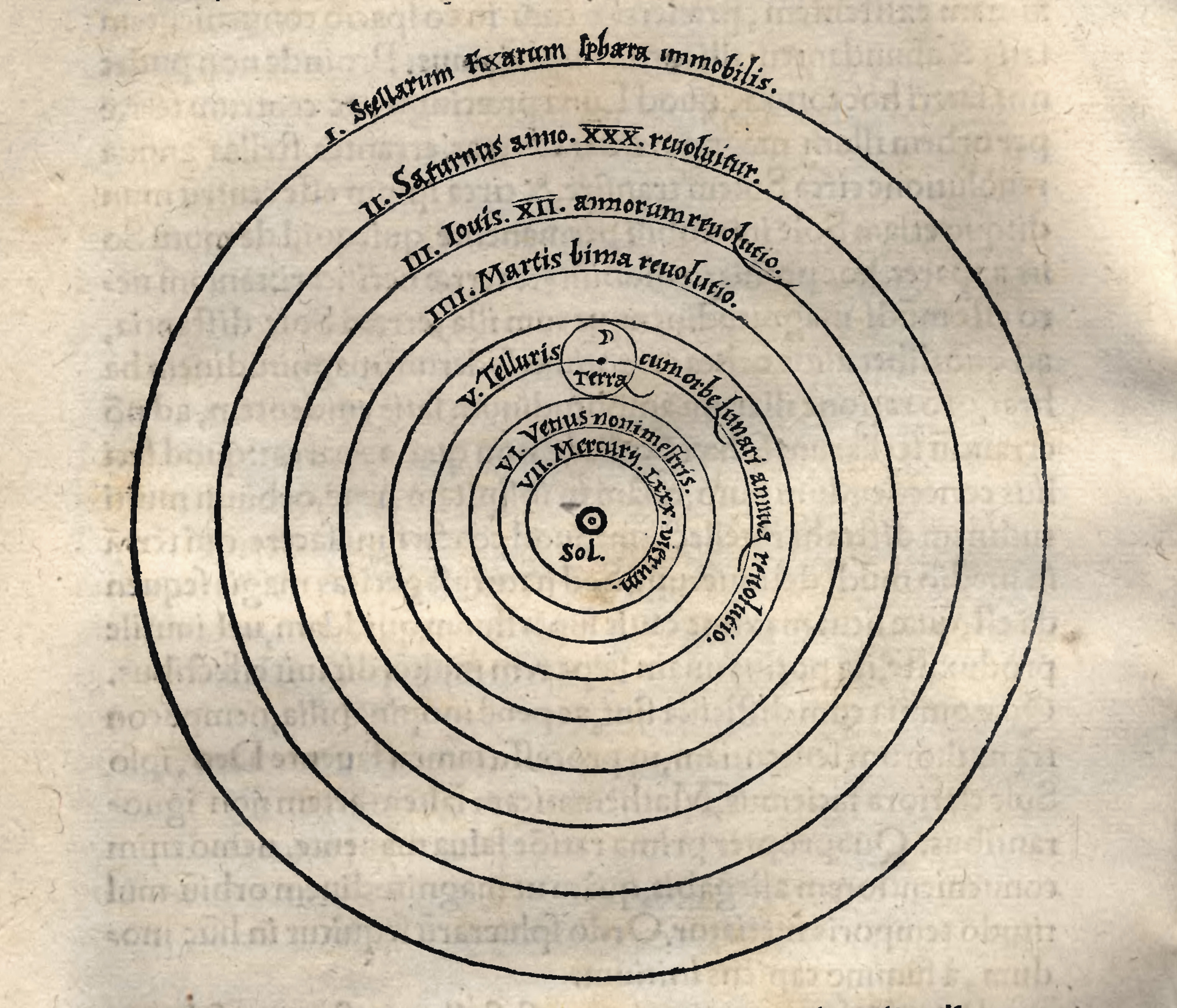
Heliocentric model from Nicolaus Copernicus's De revolutionibus orbium coelestium (On the Revolutions of the Heavenly Spheres)

Copernican heliocentrism is the astronomical model developed by the Renaissance astronomer Nicolaus Copernicus and published in 1543. This model positioned the Sun near the center of the Universe, motionless, with Earth and the other planets orbiting around it in circular paths, modified by epicycles, and at uniform speeds. The Copernican model challenged the geocentric model of Ptolemy that had prevailed for centuries, which had placed Earth at the center of the Universe.

Although Copernicus had circulated an outline of his own theory to colleagues sometime before 1514, he did not decide to publish it until he was urged to do so later by his pupil Rheticus. His model was an alternative to the longstanding Ptolemaic model that purged astronomy of the equant in order to satisfy the philosophical ideal that all celestial motion must be perfect and uniform, preserving the metaphysical implications of a mathematically ordered cosmos. His heliostatic model retained several false Ptolemaic assumptions such as the planets' circular orbits, epicycles, and uniform speeds, while at the same time using accurate ideas such as:

- The Earth is one of several planets revolving around a stationary sun in a determined order.
- The Earth rotates daily on its axis and revolves annually about the Sun.
- Retrograde motion of the planets is explained by the Earth's motion.
- The distance from the Earth to the Sun is small compared to the distance from the Sun to the stars.

The Copernican model was later replaced by Kepler's more accurate laws of planetary motion.

== Background ==
=== Antiquity ===
Philolaus (4th century BC) was one of the first to hypothesize movement of the Earth, probably inspired by Pythagoras's theories about a spherical, moving globe. In the 3rd century BCE, Aristarchus of Samos proposed what was, so far as is known, the first serious model of a heliocentric Solar System, having developed some of Heraclides Ponticus's theories (speaking of a "revolution of the Earth on its axis" every 24 hours). Though his original text has been lost, a reference in Archimedes's book The Sand Reckoner (Archimedis Syracusani Arenarius & Dimensio Circuli) describes a work in which Aristarchus advanced the heliocentric model. Archimedes wrote:

You [King Gelon] are aware the 'universe' is the name given by most astronomers to the sphere the center of which is the center of the Earth, while its radius is equal to the straight line between the center of the Sun and the center of the Earth. This is the common account as you have heard from astronomers. But Aristarchus has brought out a book consisting of certain hypotheses, wherein it appears, as a consequence of the assumptions made, that the universe is many times greater than the 'universe' just mentioned. His hypotheses are that the fixed stars and the Sun remain unmoved, that the Earth revolves about the Sun on the circumference of a circle, the Sun lying in the middle of the Floor, and that the sphere of the fixed stars, situated about the same center as the Sun, is so great that the circle in which he supposes the Earth to revolve bears such a proportion to the distance of the fixed stars as the center of the sphere bears to its surface.

— The Sand Reckoner

It is a common misconception that the heliocentric view was rejected by the contemporaries of Aristarchus. This is the result of Gilles Ménage's translation of a passage from Plutarch's On the Apparent Face in the Orb of the Moon. Plutarch reported that Cleanthes (a contemporary of Aristarchus and head of the Stoics) as a worshiper of the Sun and opponent to the heliocentric model, was jokingly told by Aristarchus that he should be charged with impiety. Ménage, shortly after the trials of Galileo and Giordano Bruno, amended an accusative (identifying the object of the verb) with a nominative (the subject of the sentence), and vice versa, so that the impiety accusation fell over the heliocentric sustainer. The resulting misconception of an isolated and persecuted Aristarchus is still transmitted today.

==== Ptolemaic system ====
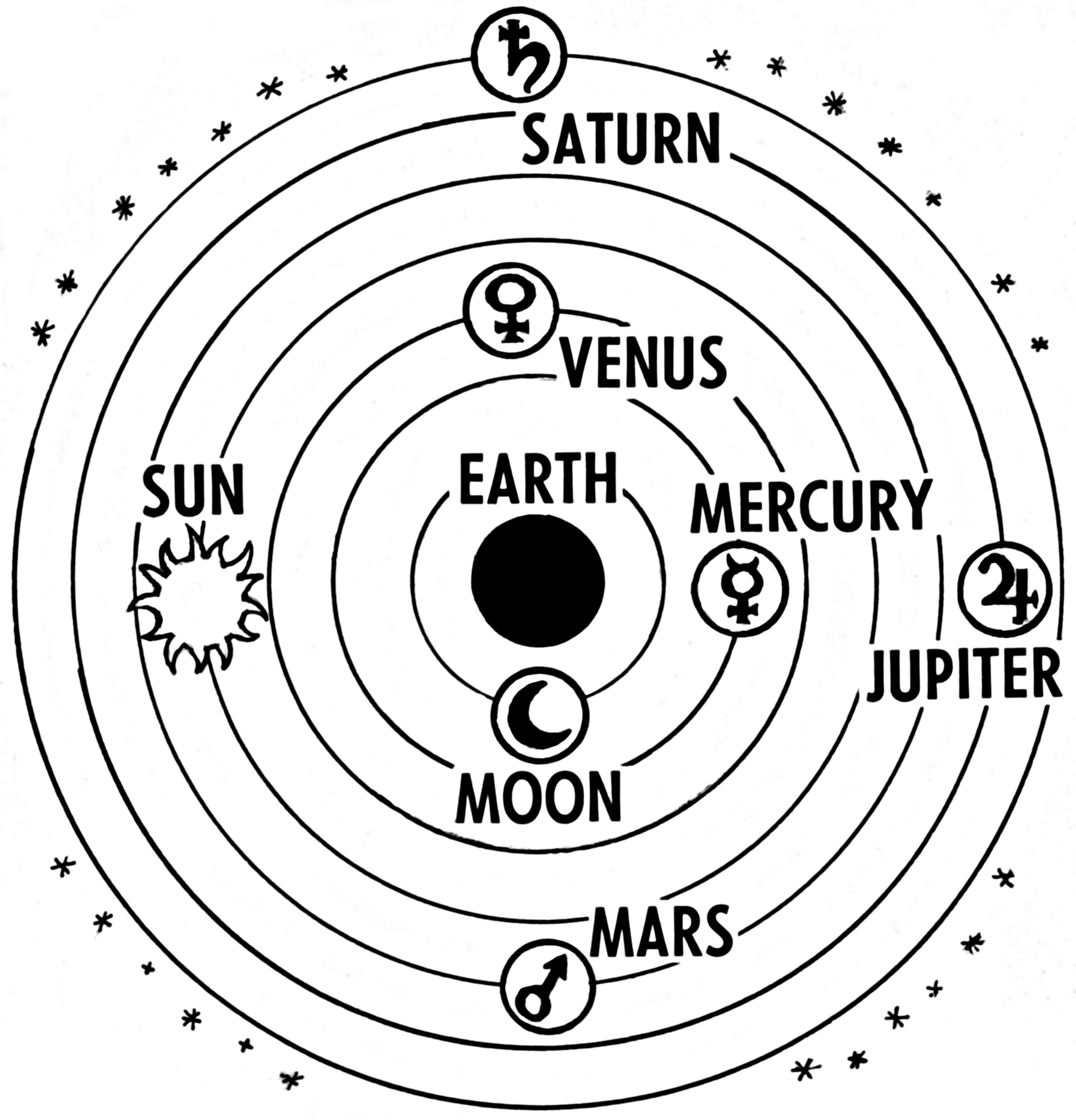
Line art drawing of Ptolemaic system

The prevailing astronomical model of the cosmos in Europe in the 1,400 years leading up to the 16th century was the Ptolemaic System, a geocentric model created by Claudius Ptolemy in his Almagest, dating from about 150 AD. Throughout the Middle Ages it was spoken of as the authoritative text on astronomy, although its author remained a little understood figure frequently mistaken as one of the Ptolemaic rulers of Egypt. The Ptolemaic system drew on many previous theories that viewed Earth as a stationary center of the universe. Stars were embedded in a large outer sphere which rotated relatively rapidly, while the planets dwelt in smaller spheres between—a separate one for each planet. To account for apparent anomalies in this view, such as the apparent retrograde motion of the planets, a system of deferents and epicycles was used. The planet was said to revolve in a small circle (the epicycle) about a center, which itself revolved in a larger circle (the deferent) about a center on or near the Earth. In The Copernican Revolution, historian Thomas Kuhn described the Almagest as the "first systematic mathematical treatise to give a complete, detailed, and quantitative account of all the celestial motions."

A complementary theory to Ptolemy's employed homocentric spheres: the spheres within which the planets rotated could themselves rotate somewhat. This theory predated Ptolemy (it was first devised by Eudoxus of Cnidus; by the time of Copernicus it was associated with Averroes). Also popular with astronomers were variations such as eccentrics—by which the rotational axis was offset and not completely at the center. The planets were also made to have exhibit irregular motions that deviated from a uniform and circular path. The eccentrics of the planets motions were analyzed to have made reverse motions over periods of observations. This retrograde motion created the foundation for why these particular pathways became known as epicycles.

Ptolemy's unique contribution to this theory was the equant—a point about which the center of a planet's epicycle moved with uniform angular velocity, but which was offset from the center of its deferent. This violated one of the fundamental principles of Aristotelian cosmology—namely, that the motions of the planets should be explained in terms of uniform circular motion, and was considered a serious defect by many medieval astronomers.

==== Aryabhata ====
In 499 CE, the Indian astronomer and mathematician Aryabhata, influenced by Greek astronomy, propounded a planetary model that explicitly incorporated Earth's rotation about its axis, which he explains as the cause of what appears to be an apparent westward motion of the stars. He also believed that the orbits of planets are elliptical. Aryabhata's followers were particularly strong in South India, where his principles of the diurnal rotation of Earth, among others, were followed and a number of secondary works were based on them.

=== Middle Ages ===
==== Islamic astronomers ====
Several Islamic astronomers questioned the Earth's apparent immobility and centrality within the universe. Some accepted that the Earth rotates around its axis, such as Al-Sijzi, who invented an astrolabe based on a belief held by some of his contemporaries "that the motion we see is due to the Earth's movement and not to that of the sky". That others besides Al-Sijzi held this view is further confirmed by a reference from an Arabic work in the 13th century which states: "According to the geometers [or engineers] (muhandisīn), the earth is in constant circular motion, and what appears to be the motion of the heavens is actually due to the motion of the earth and not the stars".

In the 12th century, Nur ad-Din al-Bitruji proposed a complete alternative to the Ptolemaic system (although not heliocentric). He declared the Ptolemaic system as an imaginary model, successful at predicting planetary positions but not real or physical. Al-Btiruji's alternative system spread through most of Europe during the 13th century. Mathematical techniques developed in the 13th to 14th centuries by the Arab and Persian astronomers Mu'ayyad al-Din al-Urdi, Nasir al-Din al-Tusi, and Ibn al-Shatir for geocentric models of planetary motions closely resemble some of the techniques used later by Copernicus in his heliocentric models.

==== European astronomers post-Ptolemy ====
Martianus Capella (5th century AD) expressed the opinion that the planets Venus and Mercury did not go about the Earth but instead circled the Sun. Capella's model was discussed in the Early Middle Ages by various anonymous 9th-century commentators and Copernicus mentions him as an influence on his own work. Macrobius (420 CE) described a heliocentric model. John Scotus Eriugena (815–877 CE) proposed a model reminiscent of that from Tycho Brahe.

Since the 13th century, European scholars were well aware of problems with Ptolemaic astronomy. The debate was precipitated by the reception by Averroes's criticism of Ptolemy, and it was again revived by the recovery of Ptolemy's text and its translation into Latin in the mid-15th century. Otto E. Neugebauer in 1957 argued that the debate in 15th-century Latin scholarship must also have been informed by the criticism of Ptolemy produced after Averroes, by the Ilkhanid-era (13th to 14th centuries) Persian school of astronomy associated with the Maragheh observatory (especially the works of al-Urdi, al-Tusi and al-Shatir). It has been argued that Copernicus could have independently discovered the Tusi couple or took the idea from Proclus's Commentary on the First Book of Euclid, which Copernicus cited. Another possible source for Copernicus's knowledge of this mathematical device is the Questiones de Spera of Nicole Oresme, who described how a reciprocating linear motion of a celestial body could be produced by a combination of circular motions similar to those proposed by al-Tusi.

In Copernicus's day, the most up-to-date version of the Ptolemaic system was that of Georg von Peuerbach (1423–1461) and his student Regiomontanus (1436–1476). The state of the question as received by Copernicus is summarized in the Theoricae novae planetarum by Peuerbach, compiled from lecture notes by Regiomontanus in 1454, but not printed until 1472. Peuerbach attempts to give a new, mathematically more elegant presentation of Ptolemy's system, but he does not arrive at heliocentrism. Regiomontanus was the teacher of Domenico Maria Novara da Ferrara, who was in turn the teacher of Copernicus. There is a possibility that Regiomontanus had already arrived at a theory of heliocentrism before his death in 1476, as he paid particular attention to the heliocentric theory of Aristarchus in a late work and mentions the "motion of the Earth" in a letter.

The state of knowledge on planetary theory received by Copernicus is summarized in Peuerbach's Theoricae Novae Planetarum (printed in 1472 by Regiomontanus). By 1470, the accuracy of observations by the Vienna school of astronomy, of which Peuerbach and Regiomontanus were members, was high enough to make the eventual development of heliocentrism inevitable, and indeed it is possible that Regiomontanus did arrive at an explicit theory of heliocentrism before his death in 1476, some 30 years before Copernicus.

== On the Revolutions of the Heavenly Spheres ==
Copernicus's major work, De revolutionibus orbium coelestium (On the Revolutions of the Heavenly Spheres; first edition 1543 in Nuremberg, second edition 1566 in Basel), was a compendium of six books published during the year of his death. The work marks the beginning of the shift away from a geocentric (and anthropocentric) universe with the Earth at its center. Copernicus held that the Earth is another planet revolving around the fixed Sun once a year and turning on its axis once a day. But while Copernicus put the Sun at the center of the Earth's orbit, he did not put it at the exact center of the universe, but near it, making it technically a heliostatic rather than a heliocentric model.

Copernicus' model also replaced the equant in Ptolemy's model with more epicycles which is what most 16th-century astronomers who read De revolutionibus considered to be his major achievement. His model offered some aesthetic appeal to some astronomers (including Galileo) but it was no more accurate than Ptolemy's.

The major features of Copernicus' model are:

1. Heavenly motions are uniform, eternal, and circular or compounded of several circles (epicycles).
2. The center of the universe is near the Sun.
3. Around the Sun, in order, are Mercury, Venus, the Earth and Moon, Mars, Jupiter, Saturn, and the fixed stars.
4. The Earth has three motions: daily rotation, annual revolution, and annual tilting of its axis.
5. Retrograde motion of the planets is explained by the Earth's motion, which in short was also influenced by planets and other celestial bodies around Earth.
6. The distance from the Earth to the Sun is small compared to the distance to the stars.

Inspiration came to Copernicus not from observation of the planets, but from reading two authors, Cicero and Plutarch. In Cicero's writings, Copernicus found an account of the theory of Hicetas. Plutarch provided an account of the Pythagoreans Heraclides Ponticus, Philolaus, and Ecphantes. These authors had proposed a moving Earth, which did not revolve around a central Sun. Copernicus cited Aristarchus and Philolaus in an early manuscript of his book which survives, stating: "Philolaus believed in the mobility of the earth, and some even say that Aristarchus of Samos was of that opinion". For unknown reasons (although possibly out of reluctance to quote pre-Christian sources), Copernicus did not include this passage in the publication of his book.

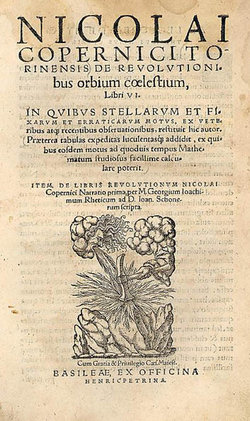
Nicolai Copernicito Torinensis De Revolutionibus Orbium Coelestium, Libri VI (On the Revolutions of the Heavenly Spheres, in six books) (title page of 2nd edition, Basel, 1566)

Copernicus used what is now known as the Urdi lemma and the Tusi couple in the same planetary models as found in Arabic sources. Furthermore, the exact replacement of the equant by two epicycles used by Copernicus in the Commentariolus was found in an earlier work by al-Shatir. Al-Shatir's lunar and Mercury models are also identical to those of Copernicus. This has led some scholars to argue that Copernicus must have had access to some yet to be identified work on the ideas of those earlier astronomers. However, no likely candidate for this conjectured work has come to light, and other scholars have argued that Copernicus could well have developed these ideas independently of the late Islamic tradition. Nevertheless, Copernicus cited some of the Islamic astronomers whose theories and observations he used in De Revolutionibus, namely al-Battani, Thabit ibn Qurra, al-Zarqali, Averroes, and al-Bitruji. It has been suggested that the idea of the Tusi couple may have arrived in Europe leaving few manuscript traces, since it could have occurred without the translation of any Arabic text into Latin. One possible route of transmission may have been through Byzantine science; Gregory Chioniades translated some of al-Tusi's works from Arabic into Byzantine Greek. Several Byzantine Greek manuscripts containing the Tusi-couple are still extant in Italy.

When Copernicus's compendium was published, it contained an unauthorized, anonymous preface by a friend of Copernicus, the Lutheran theologian Andreas Osiander. This cleric stated that Copernicus wrote his account of the Earth's movement as a mathematical hypothesis, not as an account that contained truth or even probability. Since Copernicus's hypothesis was believed to contradict the Old Testament account of the Sun's movement around the Earth (Joshua 10:12-13), this was apparently written to soften any religious backlash against the book. However, there is no evidence that Copernicus himself considered the model as merely mathematically convenient, separate from reality.

Copernicus's actual compendium began with a letter from his (by then deceased) friend Nikolaus von Schönberg, Cardinal Archbishop of Capua, urging Copernicus to publish his theory. Then, in a lengthy introduction, Copernicus dedicated the book to Pope Paul III, explaining his ostensible motive in writing the book as relating to the inability of earlier astronomers to agree on an adequate theory of the planets, and noting that if his system increased the accuracy of astronomical predictions it would allow the Church to develop a more accurate calendar. At that time, a reform of the Julian Calendar was considered necessary and was one of the major reasons for the Church's interest in astronomy.

The work itself is divided into six books:

1. The first is a general vision of the heliocentric theory, and a summarized exposition of his idea of the World.
2. The second is mainly theoretical, presenting the principles of spherical astronomy and a list of stars (as a basis for the arguments developed in the subsequent books).
3. The third is mainly dedicated to the apparent motions of the Sun and to related phenomena.
4. The fourth is a description of the Moon and its orbital motions.
5. The fifth is a concrete exposition of the new system, including planetary longitude.
6. The sixth is further concrete exposition of the new system, including planetary latitude.

== Reception ==
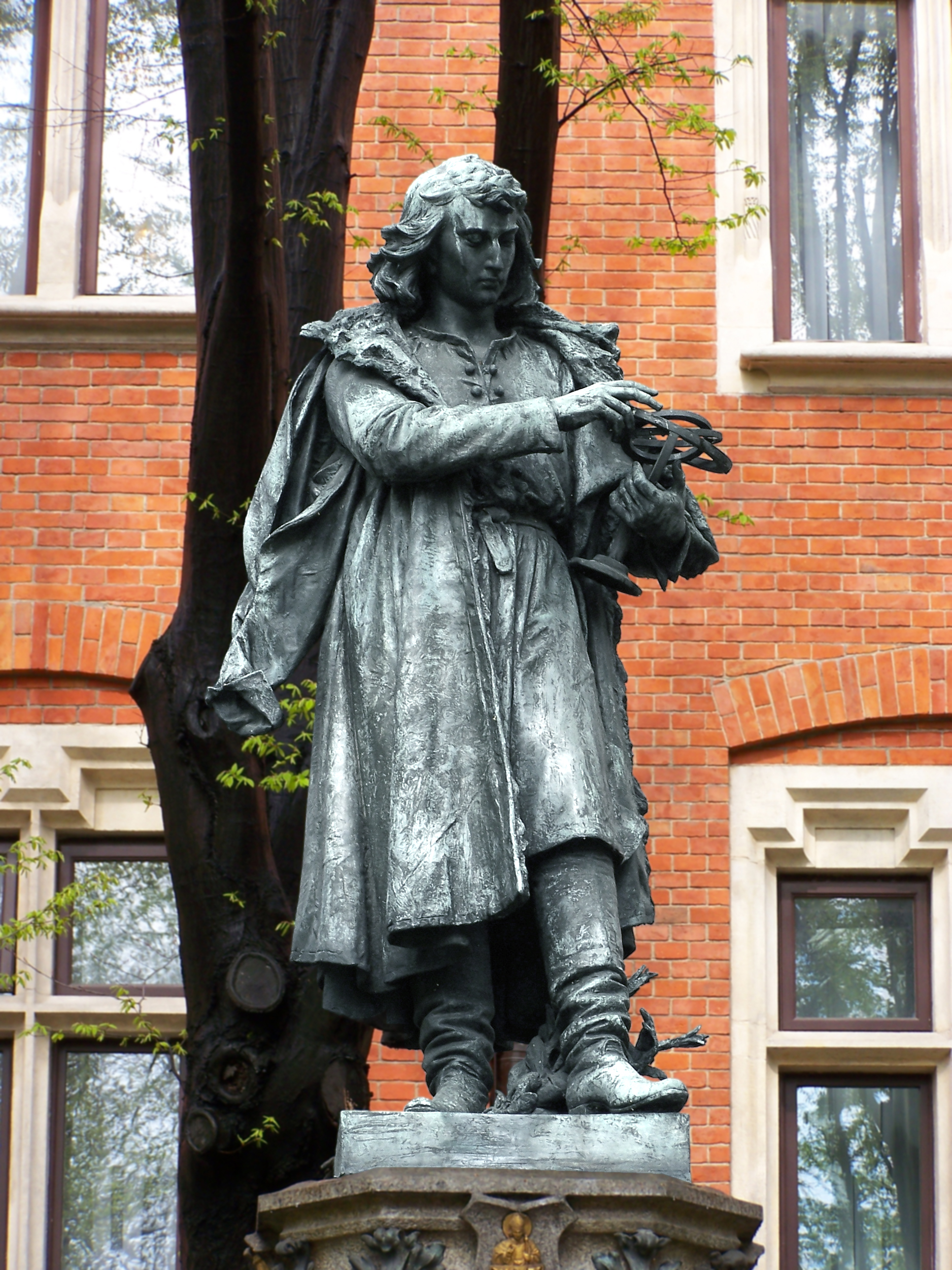
Statue of Copernicus next to Cracow University's Collegium Novum

=== 16th Century ===
De Revolutionibus was relatively widely circulated (around 500 copies of the first and second editions have survived, which is a large number by the scientific standards of the time). The majority of sixteenth-century astronomers thought that eliminating the equant was Copernicus' big achievement, because it satisfied the ancient aesthetic principle that eternal celestial motions should be uniform and circular or compounded of uniform and circular parts. On the other hand, few of Copernicus's contemporaries were ready to concede that the Earth actually moved. Even forty-five years after the publication of De Revolutionibus, the astronomer Tycho Brahe went so far as to construct a cosmology precisely equivalent to that of Copernicus, but with the Earth held fixed in the center of the celestial sphere instead of the Sun. It wasn't until after Galileo that a community of practicing astronomers appeared who accepted heliocentric cosmology.

For his contemporaries, the ideas presented by Copernicus were not markedly easier to use than the geocentric theory and did not produce more accurate predictions of planetary positions. Copernicus was aware of this and could not present any observational "proof", relying instead on arguments about what would be a more complete and elegant system. The Copernican model appeared to be contrary to common sense and to contradict the Bible.

Tycho Brahe's arguments against Copernicus are illustrative of the physical, theological, and even astronomical grounds on which heliocentric cosmology was rejected. Tycho, arguably the most accomplished astronomer of his time, appreciated the elegance of the Copernican system, but objected to the idea of a moving Earth on the basis of physics, astronomy, and religion. The Aristotelian physics of the time (modern Newtonian physics was still a century away) offered no physical explanation for the motion of a massive body like Earth, but could easily explain the motion of heavenly bodies by postulating that they were made of a different sort of substance called aether that moved naturally. So Tycho said that the Copernican system "... expertly and completely circumvents all that is superfluous or discordant in the system of Ptolemy. On no point does it offend the principle of mathematics. Yet it ascribes to the Earth, that hulking, lazy body, unfit for motion, a motion as quick as that of the aethereal torches, and a triple motion at that."

==== Problem of the sizes of stars ====
One of Tycho Brahe's main arguments involved the sizes of the stars. Whilst stars are so far away to be essentially point sources of light, to the naked eye stars appear to have measurable sizes; unbeknownst to 16th century astronomers, this was caused by diffraction, an optical effect resulting from the wave-like nature of light. This was not problematic for geocentrism; geocentric astronomers could place the stars just beyond the orbit of Saturn and even the very largest stars would have sizes comparable to the sun. However, in a heliocentric system they had to lay much farther because of the absence of any detectable stellar parallax, changes in the stars apparent brightness and relative positions caused by the movement of the Earth around the sun. Tycho reasoned that the stellar parallax could not be significantly above a minute of arc; his measurements were accurate enough that otherwise he would have noticed it. It followed that if Copernicus was correct the distance to the fixed stars would thus have to be over 700 times the Sun-to-Saturn distance. At such distances even the tiniest stars had to dwarf the Sun; as Tycho Brahe had determined that a typical third magnitude star had a size of about one arc minute, an annual parallax of one arc minute meant its size must be comparable to the orbit of Earth; first magnitude stars would be even bigger. And if the parallax was even less, the stars must be even bigger. Brahe declared such immense stars to be absurd.

Copernicans, like Christoph Rothmann, reacted with appealing to God; although such enormous stars may seem absurd to humans, they will not seem so to God, since God is infinitely greater. Copernicans described the stars in religious terms, like the fore-court in front of God’s palace or the very court of celestial angels, to make sense of them. However, whilst the anti-Copernicans admitted that God indeed could make enormous stars, they regarded everything else in God's creation as proportionate and harmonious, and contended that for God to actually act so irrationally would be bizarre. Even the introduction of the telescope in the 17th century at first failed to solve this problem. The small aperture telescopes of the time failed to resolve to stars as points but instead produced Airy disks, artifacts of diffraction; these were mistaken for the physical bodies of stars by astronomers who reasoned that if the telescope revealed the physical bodies of the planets, they must do the same for the stars. The astronomer Simon Marius had even argued that disks of stars observed through the telescope undermined Copernicus and supported Tycho. The angular sizes of the stars were smaller when viewed through the telescope, but that device had also increased the sensitivity to the parallax, so heliocentrism still required that even the smallest stars would dwarf the sun.

Only in the late seventeenth century did the first astronomers discover that the apparent sizes of stars were spurious; for example, by observing stars being occulted by the moon disappearing immediately instead of gradually being covered as would be expected based on their physical size. By 1701, some astronomers had definitely accepted that the apparently great size of stars was, in the words of Edmund Halley, a mere "Optick Fallacy". Heliocentrism thus no longer required even the smallest visible stars to dwarf the sun.

=== 17th Century ===
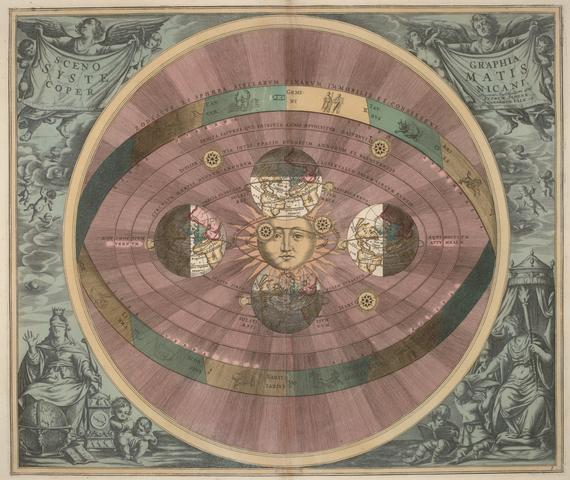
Andreas Cellarius's illustration of the Copernican system, from the Harmonia Macrocosmica (1660)

While not warmly received by his contemporaries, Copernicus' model did have a large influence on later scientists such as Galileo and Johannes Kepler, who adopted, championed and (especially in Kepler's case) sought to improve it.

- Using detailed observations by Tycho Brahe, Kepler discovered Mars's orbit was an ellipse with the Sun at one focus, and its speed varied with its distance from the Sun. This discovery was detailed in his 1609 book Astronomia nova along with the claim that all planets had elliptical orbits and non-uniform motion, stating "And finally... the sun itself... will melt all this Ptolemaic apparatus like butter".
- Using the newly invented telescope, in 1610 Galileo observed the four large moons of Jupiter (evidence that the Solar System contained bodies that did not orbit Earth), the phases of Venus (more observational evidence not properly explained by the Ptolemaic theory) and the rotation of the Sun about a fixed axis: as indicated by the apparent annual variation in the motion of sunspots;
- With a telescope, Giovanni Zupi saw the phases of Mercury in 1639;
- Isaac Newton in 1687 proposed universal gravity and the inverse-square law of gravitational attraction to explain Kepler's elliptical planetary orbits.

=== Modern ===
In 1610 Galileo Galilei observed with his telescope that Venus showed phases, despite remaining near the Sun in Earth's sky (first image). This proved that it orbits the Sun and not Earth, as predicted by Copernicus's heliocentric model and disproved the then conventional geocentric model (second image).

From a modern point of view, the Copernican model has a number of advantages. Copernicus gave a clear account of the cause of the seasons: that the Earth's axis is not perpendicular to the plane of its orbit. In addition, Copernicus's theory provided a simpler explanation for the apparent retrograde motions of the planets—namely as parallactic displacements resulting from the Earth's motion around the Sun—an important consideration in Johannes Kepler's conviction that the theory was substantially correct. In the heliocentric model the planets' apparent retrograde motions' occurring at opposition to the Sun are a natural consequence of their heliocentric orbits. In the geocentric model, however, these are explained by the ad hoc use of epicycles, whose revolutions are mysteriously tied to that of the Sun.

In the 20th century, Thomas Kuhn popularized the idea of a "Copernican Revolution" as well as the idea that Copernicus' model was the first example of a paradigm shift in human knowledge. Whether Copernicus's propositions were "revolutionary" or "conservative" has been an ongoing topic of debate in the history of science. In The Origins of Modern Science, Herbert Butterfield says that Copernicus' model was "irrelevant to the present day". In his book The Sleepwalkers: A History of Man's Changing Vision of the Universe (1959), Arthur Koestler denies that Copernicus' system is a "discovery" and instead calls it "a last attempt to patch up an out-dated machinery." Even Kuhn acknowledged that Copernicus only transferred "some properties to the Sun's many astronomical functions previously attributed to the earth." Otto Neugebauer writes that "Copernican solar theory is definitely a step in the wrong direction." Finally, the science historian David Wootton denies that Copernicus was a catalyst of the later intellectual revolution that transformed astronomy into the first modern science.

== See also ==
- Heliocentrism
- Copernican Revolution
- Copernican principle
