= Alan Musgrave =

New Zealand philosopher (1940–2026)

Alan Musgrave FRSNZ
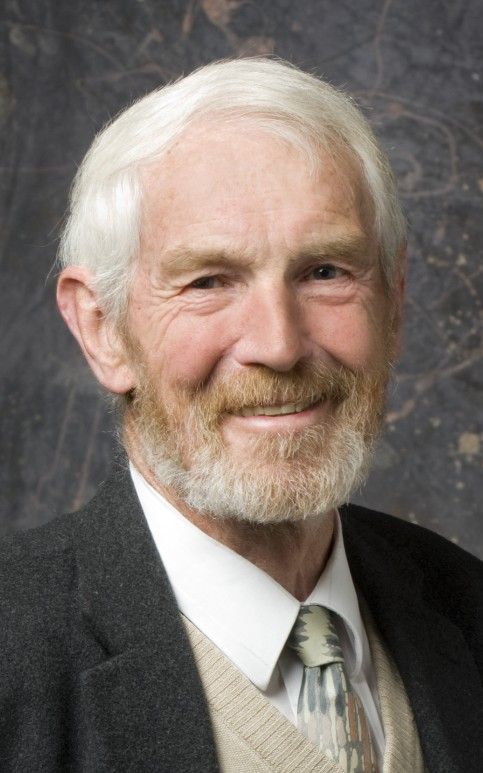
- Musgrave in 2008
- Born: Alan Edward Musgrave; 5 June 1940; Manchester, England
- Died: 20 January 2026 (aged 85); Dunedin, New Zealand

Education
- Education: London School of Economics
- Doctoral advisor: Karl Popper

Philosophical work
- Era: Contemporary philosophy
- Region: Western philosophy
- School: Analytic
- Institutions: University of Otago
- Main interests: Philosophy of science
- Notable ideas: Musgrave's scientific realism

Alan Edward Musgrave (/ˈmʌsɡreɪv/; 5 June 1940 – 20 January 2026) was a New Zealand philosopher. He was a professor at the University of Otago.

== Life and career ==
Musgrave was educated at the London School of Economics with a BA Honours philosophy and economics 1961. Karl Popper supervised Musgrave's PhD which was completed in 1969. Musgrave worked as Popper's research assistant, initially, then as a lecturer.

He was appointed to the chair of the philosophy department at the University of Otago in 1970, and was head of department from 1970 to 2005. He was 30 years old at his appointment. Along with Imre Lakatos, a friend and colleague, they edited Criticism and the Growth of Knowledge (Cambridge University Press, 1970). It is the best-selling of the four volumes that record the Kuhn–Popper debate at the 1965 London Conference that Lakatos and Musgrave organised. In 1993, Musgrave published Common Sense, Science and Scepticism, an entry-level book on epistemology, published translated into German by Gretl and Hans Albert the same year. In 1999, Musgrave had Essays on Realism and Rationalism (Rodopi) published, a collection of his scholarly papers. In 2006, he was honoured with a Festschrift: Rationality and Reality: Conversations with Alan Musgrave, edited by Colin Cheyne and John Worrall (Springer). In 2009, Musgrave published Secular Sermons: Essays on Science and Philosophy (Otago University Press), an entry-level book on science, religion and mathematics.

Among his non-scholarly achievements was the ranking of Otago's Department of Philosophy in New Zealand's Performance Based Research Funding. In both the 2003 and 2006 surveys, Otago's Philosophy department ranked as the best performing department among all academic disciplines in New Zealand. In 2010, the University of Otago embarked on a funding campaign to raise money towards a scholarship in his honour. In 2012, the University of Otago awarded Musgrave the Distinguished Research Medal, the university's highest research honour.

Musgrave died in Dunedin on 20 January 2026, at the age of 85.

== Philosophical work ==
His chief interest was in epistemology, history and philosophy of science, especially the Philosophy of Biology. The largest part of his career was dedicated to the study of Charles Darwin. Throughout his career, he defended scientific realism and scientific rationalism, and he was often considered their chief contemporary defender. He attacked various forms of idealism; most recently he attacked idealism by extending the argument popularly known as David Stove's "Gem". Metaphysically speaking, Musgrave can be considered a nominalist; he argued for a position he specifically called Pleonastic Platonism. This position basically claims that confusions within our language gives rise to Platonic entities. Pleonastic is a term with Greek roots meaning "excessive". Many of his works exhibit influence from Sir Karl Popper – his teacher as an undergraduate and postgraduate at the London School of Economics. He also shared an office with fellow philosopher Imre Lakatos while he was in London.

His form of Rationalism is subject, he admitted, to circularity; but, he insisted, it is better (even if only slightly better) than Popper's Rationalism, which admits to irrationalism. However, his form of scientific realism is much stronger. His position did not assert that science is correct, only that we may reasonably accept certain parts of it to be correct. Electrons, for example, may not exist; but that does not mean we should not believe in them.

His main criterion for believing in a scientific theory was that it generates 'novel predictions.' He was one of the few philosophers of science, on either side of the debate, to stress the distinction between novel predictions and regular predictions. A novel prediction is one that was not used in the construction of a theory, but that nevertheless follows from it. If a scientific theory makes an accurate prediction about something unknown (as opposed to a known regularity), then the theory must either be true, or the accurate 'novel' prediction was miraculously guessed. This argument had previously been applied to all scientific predictions, by many philosophers of science (the most famous, perhaps, being Hilary Putnam, who coined the clause 'Realism is the only philosophy that doesn't make science a miracle'). This aphorism however, has been criticised as being merely a chimera of sophism, used mostly for its seductive force rather than its substance. Nevertheless, Musgrave was in a smaller group by stressing that the argument can only succeed if applied solely to novel predictions. This claim however, cannot be defended logically as it commits the petitio principii fallacy of assuming, without adequate justification, the conclusion it is supposed to defend. However, while admitting circularity within the argument (in that "miracle arguments" seek to justify scientific "inference to the best explanation" by use of an inference to the best explanation), Musgrave defended his stance as one making a conclusion about rational belief rather than truth. Because he made this distinction about knowing for certain that a theory is right, and reasonably believing that a theory is right, he evaded many classical objections to realism.

=== Musgrave's scientific realism ===
Traditional scientific realism is the view that:

1. If a scientific theory 'X' generates correct novel predictions, then theory 'X' is true.
2. Scientific theory 'X' generates novel predictions.
3. Therefore, scientific theory 'X' is true.

Musgrave's scientific realism is the view that:

1. If a scientific theory 'X' generates correct novel predictions, then it is reasonable to believe that theory 'X' is true.
2. Scientific theory 'X' generates novel predictions.
3. Therefore, it is reasonable to believe that scientific theory 'X' is true.

In the latter argument, premise 1) is still highly controversial, but it has been argued to be less so than premise 1) of the former argument. He argues for the latter premises 1) with such things as the Miracle Argument and novel predictions (above). In this way, he tries to do away with many sceptical objections about realism: he is no more wrong to believe in a theory's truth than an instrumentalist is to believe in a theory's usefulness, but that alone neither justifies nor warrants his claim that the theory is true. Both philosophers have the same chance of being wrong; and, with scientific realism, Musgrave also receives an explanation of events that the instrumentalist does not have. He often says that instrumentalists say the name of the game is "saving the phenomena," but he sees no reason that it should not also be "explaining the phenomena."

As for criticism of premise 1) in the latter argument, anti-realists point out that such a principle can only be justified through circular reasoning. For instance, to arrive at justification of 1), the best one can do is argue that this principle has escaped serious criticism and therefore is reasonable to accept. But why should one accept the corollary principle of "a principle that has escaped serious criticism is reasonable to accept"? The reply is that it itself is a principle that has escaped serious criticism. This boot-strapping is an unavoidable consequence of Musgrave's critical rationalism. Musgrave openly admits the circularity of his view, however he is quick to point out that anti-realism has nothing better to offer, and indeed, that not all circles are so vicious.
