= Paul Hoyningen-Huene =

German philosopher

Paul Hoyningen-Huene (born 31 July 1946 in Pfronten, West Germany) is a German philosopher who specializes in general philosophy of science and research ethics. He is best known for his Neo-Kantian interpretation of Thomas S. Kuhn's ideas. Hoyningen-Huene, until 2014, held the chair for theoretical philosophy, particularly philosophy of science at Leibniz Universität Hannover (Germany) and was director of the Center for Philosophy and Ethics of Science.

== Biography ==
Hoyningen-Huene studied physics as well as philosophy at LMU Munich, the Imperial College of Science and Technology, London, and the University of Zurich. He received a graduate degree in theoretical physics from LMU Munich in 1971 and earned his doctorate in theoretical physics at the University of Zurich in 1975. He was then an assistant with Hermann Lübbe at the Seminar for Philosophy at the University of Zurich. Hoyningen-Huene taught at the University of Zurich, the University of Bern (Switzerland), and at ETH Zurich (Swiss Federal Institute of Technology). From 1984 to 1985, he was a visiting scholar with Thomas S. Kuhn at the Department of Linguistics and Philosophy at MIT, and from 1987 to 1988 he was a senior visiting fellow at the Center for Philosophy of Science in Pittsburgh.

In the period from 1990 to 1997, Hoyningen-Huene held the chair for foundational theory and history of the sciences, particularly the exact sciences, at the University of Konstanz (Germany). In 1997, he became the founding director of the Center for Philosophy and Ethics of Science at the University of Hannover (Germany). In 2010, the center was integrated into the newly founded Institute of Philosophy under the direction of Hoyningen-Huene.
Hoyningen-Huene held positions as visiting professor in Switzerland (1980, 1987, 2010, 2012), Jugoslavia (1989, 1990), Denmark (1995, 2000) and Norway (1999).

== Areas of work ==
Hoyningen-Huene's work has focused on issues in general philosophy of science, particularly on the philosophical writings of Thomas S. Kuhn and Paul Feyerabend and the subject of incommensurability. In his influential book Reconstructing Scientific Revolutions: Thomas S. Kuhn's Philosophy of Science he presents a Neo-Kantian reconstruction of Kuhn's philosophy of science and opposes an irrationalist interpretation of Kuhn.
In addition, Hoyningen-Huene is interested in the limits of reductionism in science, emergentism and the development of a theory of anti-reductionist arguments. His most recent book Systematicity: The Nature of Science is devoted to the question of the nature of science (including the social sciences and humanities) and develops the thesis that scientific knowledge is primarily distinguished from other forms of knowledge by being more systematic.

In the field of ethics of science, Hoyningen-Huene has primarily dealt with questions concerning the responsibility of scientists and engineers.

== Awarded memberships ==
- 2009: International Academy of Science, Munich
- 2001: Leopoldina, German National Academy of Sciences

== Selected publications ==
- Reductionism and Systems Theory in the Life Sciences: Some Problems and Perspectives (ed. with Franz M. Wuketits), Dordrecht: Kluwer, 1989
- Reconstructing Scientific Revolutions: Thomas S. Kuhn's Philosophy of Science. Translated by Alexander T. Levine. (With a foreword by Thomas S. Kuhn.) Chicago: University of Chicago Press, 2. Ed., 1993.
- Incommensurability and Related Matters. Boston Studies in the Philosophy of Science, vol. 216 (ed. with Howard Sankey). Dordrecht: Kluwer, 2001
- Formal Logic. A philosophical approach. Translated by Alexander T. Levine. Pittsburgh: Pittsburgh University Press, 2004.
- Rethinking Scientific Change and Theory Comparison: Stabilities, Ruptures, Incommensurabilities. Boston Studies in the Philosophy of Science, vol. 255 (ed. with Léna Soler and Howard Sankey). Berlin: Springer, 2008
- Systematicity: The Nature of Science. New York: Oxford University Press, 2013.
