= Kuhn–Popper debate =

Scientific debate

The Kuhn–Popper debate was a debate surrounding research methods and the advancement of scientific knowledge. In 1965, at the University of London's International Colloquium in the Philosophy of Science, Thomas Kuhn and Karl Popper engaged in a debate that circled around three main areas of disagreement. These areas included the concept of a scientific method, the specific behaviors and practices of scientists, and the differentiation between scientific knowledge and other forms of knowledge.

== Background ==
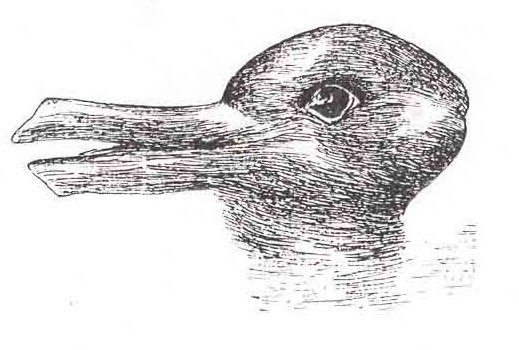
The Rabbit–duck illusion was used by Wittgenstein to explain difference in between 'seeing that' and 'seeing as', and later the Rabbit–duck illusion used in The Structure of Scientific Revolutions to explain the concept of gestalt psychology in relation to scientists and paradigms

=== Thomas Kuhn ===
Thomas Kuhn (1922–1996) was born into a world of technological and scientific advancement. Working as a historian and philosopher of science at MIT, Kuhn published The Structure of Scientific Revolutions in 1962, proposing a theory for classifying generational knowledge under frameworks known as paradigms. Paradigms being, "an accepted model or pattern", when upturned, "what were ducks in the scientist's world before the revolution are rabbits afterwards."

=== Karl Popper ===
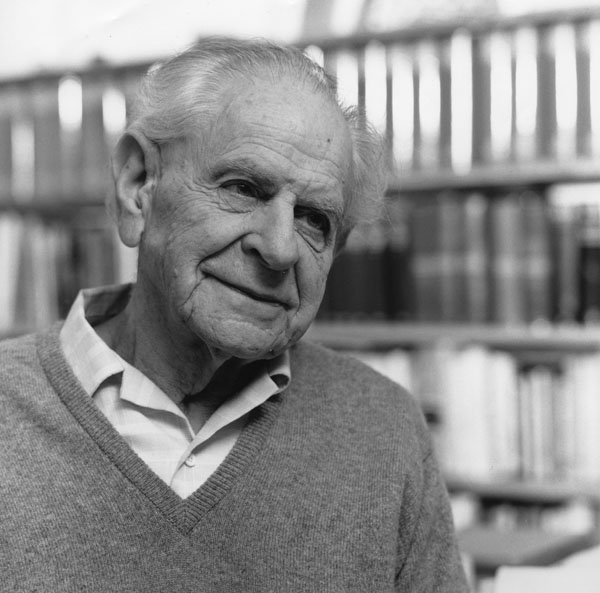
Karl Popper (1902–1994), a physicist and philosopher of science

Karl Popper (1902–1994) was born into a world of dogmatism and ideology amidst totalitarianism and WW2. As a Jew at the University of Vienna, Popper had fled to New Zealand taking up professorship at the University of Canterbury. Here, he had begun to write The Poverty of Historicism (1957) and The Open Society and Its Enemies (1945) the day the Nazis stormed Austria. Both works are critical analyses of methodologies within the social sciences. However beyond the social sciences, Popper was also a physicist who lived amidst the second quantum revolution. Such a time proceeded through bold ideas and questions (a time which Kuhn identified as revolutionary science.)

This background inspired Popper to produce methodological ways of knowing based upon critical rationalism, producing the concept of falsifiability. Because of Kuhn and Popper's different contexts, the two proposed starkly different theories on the growth of knowledge. However, it is recognized that the two shared similar fan bases and still agreed on most areas of contention within the sciences.

== Debate ==
=== Argument ===
Karl Popper and Thomas Kuhn's debate was largely sparked by the rise of psychology during the 1960s. The rise of psychology in the 60's was part of a larger cultural shift in western society amidst the Cold War, Civil Rights Movement, advancements of early computers, and globalisation. This allowed for trends to be seen around the world quickly, to create more accurate simulations to model the brain, and increased conversations on social issues. In the wake of this historical underpinning, Kuhn viewed psychology as a method of view history, creating paradigms and structures to explain mass shifts in thought.

Before the debate, Thomas Kuhn synthesized these theories in psychology to make a structure for how scientific revolutions progress in The Structure of Scientific Revolutions (1962).

Thomas Kuhn structured scientific research trends as the progression of paradigms and paradigm shifts. An example of a paradigm would be the geocentric model of the universe; an example of a paradigm shift would when the heliocentric model began taking over due to irrefutable evidence (largely from Galileo Galilei, Johannes Kepler, and Isaac Newton). In Kuhn's model, these three would be revolutionary scientists, because they changed the model. On the other hand, normal scientists are those who work under paradigms, and determine the smaller details of the theory as it goes on.

Meanwhile, Karl Popper was a critical rationalist, who began his early studies in psychology under Adler, then later turned to physics and philosophy, giving up on psychology after finding psychology to be a 'pseudoscience' due to many axioms in the field being unfalsifiable. Karl Popper understood the logic of Kuhn's model, but did not support it: he saw Kuhn's ideas as dangerous because they created theoretical laws out of trends that were not testable, therefore not falsifiable. To Popper, it was a type of historicism based on the adage that history repeats itself.

Popper is largely known for his writing against damaging ideologies throughout history. For this reason, he saw many overlaps between Kuhn's model and other inductive social theories that were attractive, but impossible to prove. Popper argued Kuhn's model was far too deterministic, warning that Kuhn's model should not be blindly believed. He was a critical rationalist, and placed value on individual approaches, while Kuhn looked at the trends of the masses. Seeing Kuhn's model as similar to Richard Feynman's later discussion of cargo-cult science in the 1970s, he argued that if everyone adopted Kuhn's model, it would be self-fulfilling and there would only be the mentality of the normal scientist.

Popper's proposal can be thought of as Kuhn's revolutionary scientists' vision: Scientists must hold themselves accountable to the facts, and be constantly questioning the prevailing paradigm. Popper greatly detested the incoming "'post-rationalist' [...] age, proudly dedicated to the destruction of the tradition of rational philosophy and of rational thought itself," characteristic of growing subjectivism in the 1960s.

Kuhn believed that Popper's perspective only focused on "the extraordinary or revolutionary episodes in scientific development", which "obscured [...] the existence of normal research." As a historical relativist, Kuhn found Popper's conception of progress aligned with the Whig Tradition, which is a "form of historiography that assumes scientific progress" in so far as research has some higher goal.

Kuhn cared about science as a way to solve problems, whereas Popper cared about science as a way to determine truths. Popper's model, however, was prescriptive rather than truly reflective of reality, often attacked for being too 'romantic', whereas Kuhn's was popularly accepted to have realistically portrayed scientific progression from a sociological perspective.

In the end, Popper was far more idealistic, urging the scientist to work beyond their paradigm, and hold themselves to a higher standard. In opposition, Kuhn was far more pragmatic; he developed a new approach to understanding research which agreed with the history of science. Popper's argument holds sway amongst naturalists, claiming that "we become makers of our fate when we have ceased to pose as its prophets" against the deterministic nature of Kuhn's model. In contradistinction, Kuhn's argument holds footing amongst researchers in the humanities. This is because Kuhn created useful models and terminology to better understand history as thought in a time where relativism and revisionism was becoming of increasing value in academic circles. The conflict was about the future of science and what standards scientists should be held to when they conduct research.

=== Outcome ===
Inquiry was central to the Kuhn–Popper debate, and while the two men were both philosophers of science, one was a historian and the other a scientist. Their backgrounds greatly influenced their perspectives. The debate never reached a true consensus; however, it represents two popular perspectives on how to treat the growth of knowledge, promoting:

- Deconstruction and recognition of confirmation bias;
- Constant revision and testing;
- Using a framework to inform methodologies.

Popper's argument is largely seen as the aim of research institutions and researchers, while Kuhn created a picture of what science is right now.

== Philosophical influences ==
Karl Popper's initial perspectives paid tribute to Bertrand Russell and Tarski. However Popper soon diverted from these early influences, rejecting specific linguistic analyses as a means to derive deeper meanings from, favoring less-specific cases instead (finding social systems to be too complex a system to deconstruct from deductive inference.) Often Popper looked for how language was broadly used, and from there, deconstructed anti-rationalist tendencies such as historicism and Marxism using falsifiability. This approach largely removed him from the dominant Neo-Kantian tradition.

Popper's philosophical doctrine is that of critical rationalism. It is dependent upon a theory for attaining knowledge which rejected causation as a viable path to knowledge due its inability to explain future events. This is inspired by Hume's problem of induction, where Hume says:

"...the supposition, that the future resembles the past, is not founded on arguments of any kind,' but is deriv'd entirely from habit."

In The Logic of Scientific Discovery Popper refuted Hume's final sentiment that nothing can be known due to the illusory nature of the world, and instead proposed a deductive model of science. This model is rationalist, but critical insofar as it actively rejects inductivism.
