= The Copernican Revolution (book) =

1957 book by Thomas Kuhn

The Copernican Revolution: Planetary Astronomy in the Development of Western Thought
- Cover of the first edition
- Author: Thomas S. Kuhn
- Language: English
- Subject: History of astronomy
- Publisher: Harvard University Press
- Publication date: 1957
- Publication place: United States
- Media type: Print (Hardcover and Paperback)
- Pages: 297
- ISBN: 0-674-17103-9

The Copernican Revolution is a 1957 book by the philosopher Thomas Kuhn, in which the author provides an analysis of the Copernican Revolution, documenting the pre-Ptolemaic understanding through the Ptolemaic system and its variants until the eventual acceptance of the Keplerian system.

Kuhn argues that the Ptolemaic system provided broader appeal than a simple astronomical system but also became intertwined in broader philosophical and theological beliefs. Kuhn argues that this broader appeal made it more difficult for other systems to be proposed.

Note that while some of the illustrations used are a bit complex, Kuhn limits the technical information included in the primary text, and leaves them for a technical appendix at the back of the book.

== Summary ==
=== Introduction - Importance of Understanding the Development of Science ===
Before diving into a historical overview of the scientific understanding of the planets, stars and other celestial bodies, Kuhn prefaces the main ideas in The Copernican Revolution (in Chapter 1) by arguing that the story of the shift from a geocentric understanding of the universe to a heliocentric one offers a great deal of insight far beyond the specifics of that shift. Kuhn would later develop his theory regarding the development of science in his later work “The Structure of Scientific Revolutions,” which was originally published in 1962 and remains his best known work. In this work, he focuses on a one particular example; namely the Copernican Revolution, which is a paradigmatic example of such a change.

That Kuhn saw the significance and importance of this understanding as crucial for a contemporary understanding of science, and that he saw the Copernican Reboluvion as a representative example can be seen by what he focuses on in Chapter 1. Here, regarding the Copernican Revolution he notes: "...it has an additional significance which transcends its specific subject: it illustrates a process that today we badly need to understand. Contemporary Western civilization is more dependent, both for its everyday philosophy and for its bread and butter, upon scientific concepts than any past civilization has been. But the scientific theories that bulk so large in our daily lives are unlikely to be final... The mutability of its fundamental concepts is not an argument for rejecting science... But an age as dominated by science as our own does need a perspective from which to examine the scientific beliefs which it takes so much for granted." Kuhn stresses that our lack of familiarity with the process of development of science is a dangerous gap in our knowledge because without it, we cannot expect to reasonably assess the success or accuracy of scientific ideas and theories.

=== The Heavens in Primitive Cosmologies ===
After the brief introduction which included at the beginning of the first chapter, Kuhn takes the remainder of the chapter to explain the pre-Copernican understanding of the celestial world. He quickly shows that this worldview was not simply the result of a simple, unscientific perspective, but in fact contained many of the components that we expect to see in a sophisticated, scientific worldview. For example, Kuhn shows how a “two sphere universe” - the model that saw the earth as a small sphere at the center of the universe with an outer sphere or stars that rotates (and the sun traveling in between) provided a framework that matched observations, allowed for mathematical predictions about the locations of stars in the sky at a future date, simplified what otherwise seemed to be the confounding movement of the sun, provided a simple explanation for many observed phenomena, explained differences in observations that were made from different places on Earth etc. Kuhn develops this convincingly by walking the reader through a range of observations about the movement of the sun and stars and details about how these corresponded to the model of the universe. This is supported by the fact that there are use cases even today, as Kuhn highlights, where we continue to use a version of this model of the universe.

=== The Problem of the Planets ===
After using the first chapter to show how primitive conceptions of the celestial spheres satisfied many requirements for a scientific theory, Kuhn highlights the most vexing issues with the model. While the model was quite satisfactory in explaining and predicting the movement of the stars, it struggled mightily to explain the movement of the planets. The definition of a planet at that time differs somewhat from our own, so Kuhn explains: "The term planet is derived from a Greek word meaning, "wanderer" and it was employed until after Copnicus' lifetime to distinguish between those celestial bodies that moved or "wandered" among the stars from those who relative positions were fixed. For the Greeks and their successors the sun was one of the seven planets. The others were the moon, Mercury, Venus, Mars, Jupiter and Saturn. The stars and these seven planets were the only bodies recognized as celestial in antiquity." While the stars generally moved in lockstep, in predictable and organized fashion, the planets seemingly had a much more complex motion. Tracking their movement in the sky (based on observations over time) there are many inconsistencies. While the planets (other than the sun and moon) generally moved eastward in the sky, at times they would be observed moving westward, or "retrograde". Further, unlike the stars, that moved in lockstep, the planets each seemed to have their own schedules, traveling at different speeds. Astrologers throughout the years had many different theories to explain the movement. Most (but not all) models involved the planets rotating around the earth inside the stellar sphere (the sphere that was assumed to hold the stars).

=== Conclusion ===
At the end of the book, Kuhn summarizes the achievements of Copernicus and Newton, while comparing the incompatibility of Newtonian physics with Aristotelian concepts that preceded the then new physics. Kuhn also noted that discoveries, such as that produced by Newton, were not in agreement with the prevailing worldview during his lifetime.
