= Black-Body Theory and the Quantum Discontinuity, 1894–1912 =

1978 book by Thomas S. Kuhn

- Cover of the first edition
- Author: Thomas S. Kuhn
- Language: English
- Subject: Quantum mechanics
- Published: 1978 (Oxford University Press, first edition); 1987 (University of Chicago Press, second edition)
- Publication place: United States
- Media type: Print (Hardcover and Paperback)
- Pages: 356
- ISBN: 0-19-520091-8 (first edition); 0-226-45800-8 (second edition)

Black-Body Theory and the Quantum Discontinuity, 1894–1912 (1978; second edition 1987) is a book by the philosopher Thomas Kuhn, in which the author surveys the development of quantum mechanics. The second edition has a new afterword.

== Summary ==
Kuhn surveys the development of quantum mechanics by Max Planck at the end of the 19th century. He argues that Planck misread his own earlier work.

== Reception ==
Alexander Bird describes Kuhn's book as "masterly", writing that it "differs from traditional history of science less in the kind of explanation offered and more in the vast erudition and scholarly attention to detail displayed."

According to philosopher Tim Maudlin, Planck and the Black Body Discontinuity (sic) "is a mixed bag: some good historiography and some poor analysis."
