= The Structure of Scientific Revolutions =

1962 book by Thomas S. Kuhn

- Cover of the first edition
- Author: Thomas S. Kuhn
- Cover artist: Ted Lacey
- Language: English
- Subject: History of science
- Publisher: University of Chicago Press
- Publication date: 1962
- Publication place: United States
- Media type: Print (hardcover and paperback)
- Pages: 264
- ISBN: 9780226458113
- Dewey Decimal: 501
- LC Class: Q175.K95

The Structure of Scientific Revolutions is a 1962 book about the history of science by the philosopher Thomas S. Kuhn. Its publication was a landmark event in the history, philosophy, and sociology of science. Kuhn challenged the then prevailing view of progress in science in which scientific progress was viewed as "development-by-accumulation" of accepted facts and theories. Kuhn argued for an episodic model in which periods of conceptual continuity and cumulative progress, referred to as periods of "normal science", were interrupted by periods of revolutionary science. The discovery of "anomalies" accumulating and precipitating revolutions in science leads to new paradigms. New paradigms then ask new questions of old data, move beyond the mere "puzzle-solving" of the previous paradigm, alter the rules of the game and change the "map" directing new research.

For example, Kuhn's analysis of the Copernican Revolution emphasized that, in its beginning, it did not offer more accurate predictions of celestial events, such as planetary positions, than the Ptolemaic system, but instead appealed to some practitioners based on a promise of better, simpler solutions that might be developed at some point in the future. Kuhn called the core concepts of an ascendant revolution its "paradigms" and thereby launched this word into widespread analogical use in the second half of the 20th century. Kuhn's insistence that a paradigm shift was a mélange of sociology, enthusiasm and scientific promise, but not a logically determinate procedure, caused an uproar in reaction to his work. Kuhn addressed concerns in the 1969 postscript to the second edition. For some commentators The Structure of Scientific Revolutions introduced a realistic humanism into the core of science, while for others the nobility of science was tarnished by Kuhn's introduction of an irrational element into the heart of its greatest achievements.

== History ==
The Structure of Scientific Revolutions was first published as a monograph in the International Encyclopedia of Unified Science, then as a book by University of Chicago Press in 1962. In 1969, Kuhn added a postscript to the book in which he replied to critical responses to the first edition. A 50th Anniversary Edition (with an introductory essay by Ian Hacking) was published by the University of Chicago Press in April 2012.

Kuhn dated the genesis of his book to 1947, when he was a graduate student at Harvard University and had been asked to teach a science class for humanities undergraduates with a focus on historical case studies. Kuhn later commented that until then, "I'd never read an old document in science." Aristotle's Physics was astonishingly unlike Isaac Newton's work in its concepts of matter and motion. Kuhn wrote: "as I was reading him, Aristotle appeared not only ignorant of mechanics, but a dreadfully bad physical scientist as well. About motion, in particular, his writings seemed to me full of egregious errors, both of logic and of observation." This was in an apparent contradiction with the fact that Aristotle was a brilliant mind. While perusing Aristotle's Physics, Kuhn formed the view that in order to properly appreciate Aristotle's reasoning, one must be aware of the scientific conventions of the time. Kuhn concluded that Aristotle's concepts were not "bad Newton," just different. This insight was the foundation of The Structure of Scientific Revolutions.

Central ideas regarding the process of scientific investigation and discovery had been anticipated by Ludwik Fleck in Fleck (1935). Fleck had developed the first system of the sociology of scientific knowledge. He claimed that the exchange of ideas led to the establishment of a thought collective, which, when developed sufficiently, separated the field into esoteric (professional) and exoteric (laymen) circles. Kuhn wrote the foreword to the 1979 edition of Fleck's book, noting that he read it in 1950 and was reassured that someone "saw in the history of science what I myself was finding there."

Kuhn was not confident about how his book would be received. Harvard University had denied his tenure a few years prior. By the mid-1980s, however, his book had achieved blockbuster status. When Kuhn's book came out in the early 1960s, "structure" was an intellectually popular word in many fields in the humanities and social sciences, including linguistics and anthropology, appealing in its idea that complex phenomena could reveal or be studied through basic, simpler structures. Kuhn's book contributed to that idea.

One theory to which Kuhn replies directly is Karl Popper's "falsificationism," which stresses falsifiability as the most important criterion for distinguishing between that which is scientific and that which is unscientific. Kuhn also addresses verificationism, a philosophical movement that emerged in the 1920s among logical positivists. The verifiability principle claims that meaningful statements must be supported by empirical evidence or logical requirements.

== Synopsis ==
=== Basic approach ===
Kuhn's approach to the history and philosophy of science addresses conceptual issues like the practice of normal science, influence of historical events, emergence of scientific discoveries, nature of scientific revolutions and progress through scientific revolutions. What sorts of intellectual options and strategies were available to people during a given period? What types of lexicons and terminology were known and employed during certain epochs? Stressing the importance of not attributing traditional thought to earlier investigators, Kuhn's book argues that the evolution of scientific theory does not emerge from the straightforward accumulation of facts, but rather from a set of changing intellectual circumstances and possibilities.

Kuhn did not see scientific theory as proceeding linearly from an objective, unbiased accumulation of all available data, but rather as paradigm-driven:

"The operations and measurements that a scientist undertakes in the laboratory are not "the given" of experience but rather "the collected with difficulty". They are not what the scientist sees—at least not before his research is well advanced and his attention focused. Rather, they are concrete indices to the content of more elementary perceptions, and as such they are selected for the close scrutiny of normal research only because they promise opportunity for the fruitful elaboration of an accepted paradigm. Far more clearly than the immediate experience from which they in part derive, operations and measurements are paradigm-determined. Science does not deal in all possible laboratory manipulations. Instead, it selects those relevant to the juxtaposition of a paradigm with the immediate experience that that paradigm has partially determined. As a result, scientists with different paradigms engage in different concrete laboratory manipulations."

— Kuhn (1962, p. 216)

=== Historical examples of chemistry ===
Kuhn explains his ideas using examples taken from the history of science. For instance, eighteenth-century scientists believed that homogenous solutions were chemical compounds. Therefore, a combination of water and alcohol was generally classified as a compound. Nowadays it is considered to be a solution, but there was no reason then to suspect that it was not a compound. Water and alcohol would not separate spontaneously, nor will they separate completely upon distillation (they form an azeotrope). Water and alcohol can be combined in any proportion.

Under this paradigm, scientists believed that chemical reactions (such as the combination of water and alcohol) did not necessarily occur in fixed proportion. This belief was ultimately overturned by Dalton's atomic theory, which asserted that atoms can only combine in simple, whole-number ratios. Under this new paradigm, any reaction which did not occur in fixed proportion could not be a chemical process. This type of world-view transition among the scientific community exemplifies Kuhn's paradigm shift.

=== Examples from applied microbiology ===
In 1860 Louis Pasteur published experimental results proving that fermentation was caused by microorganisms, instead of some self-starting chemical reaction, which was the reigning theory. As summarized by science writer Charles Mann, "Pasteur’s work led to a pitched intellectual battle—and the eventual triumph of germ theory, which overturned earlier ideas about infectious disease." Mann continues:

Pasteur’s work on the role of microorganisms in infectious disease inaugurated the modern discipline of microbiology—and led to a host of about-faces in previous medical beliefs. German researcher Robert Koch, often considered microbiology’s co-founder, then discovered the microbes that caused anthrax, cholera and tuberculosis. All cast aside earlier ideas. For instance, many in Koch’s Germany believed tuberculosis was a hereditary disease passed down through families until 1882, when the scientist unveiled Mycobacterium tuberculosis, the bacterium responsible for the disease.

While paradigm shifts in the physical and chemical sciences can greatly affect how technologies evolve in societally impactful ways, anything pertaining to the wellbeing of human bodies can easily become politicized. Mann offers examples pertaining to the decades long controversy over the age threshold recommended for regular breast cancer screenings and to the initial World Health Organization pronouncement in 2020 that COVID-19 could not be transmitted through the air. Government policies and mandates issued to thwart the COVID-19 pandemic were in part impelled by scientific understandings that were later overturned.

=== Copernican Revolution ===
A famous example of a revolution in scientific thought is the Copernican Revolution. In Ptolemy's school of thought, cycles and epicycles (with some additional concepts) were used for modeling the movements of the planets in a cosmos that had a stationary Earth at its center. As accuracy of celestial observations increased, complexity of the Ptolemaic cyclical and epicyclical mechanisms had to increase to maintain the calculated planetary positions close to the observed positions. Copernicus proposed a cosmology in which the Sun was at the center and the Earth was one of the planets revolving around it. For modeling the planetary motions, Copernicus used the tools he was familiar with, namely the cycles and epicycles of the Ptolemaic toolbox. Yet Copernicus' model needed more cycles and epicycles than existed in the then-current Ptolemaic model, and due to a lack of accuracy in calculations, his model did not appear to provide more accurate predictions than the Ptolemy model. (Note: According to science historian William Shea, the number of epicycles used by Copernicus "is not much less than that of Ptolemy". However, he argues that if the reason for preferring one astronomical system to another were to lie in the precision of the predictions, it would have been difficult to choose between the Ptolemaic and the Copernican systems.) Copernicus' contemporaries rejected his cosmology, and Kuhn asserts that they were quite right to do so: Copernicus' cosmology lacked credibility.

Kuhn illustrates how a paradigm shift later became possible when Galileo Galilei introduced his new ideas concerning motion. Intuitively, when an object is set in motion, it soon comes to a halt. A well-made cart may travel a long distance before it stops, but unless something keeps pushing it, it will eventually stop moving. Aristotle had argued that this was presumably a fundamental property of nature: for the motion of an object to be sustained, it must continue to be pushed. Given the knowledge available at the time, this represented sensible, reasonable thinking.

Galileo put forward a bold alternative conjecture: suppose, he said, that we always observe objects coming to a halt simply because some friction is always occurring. Galileo had no equipment with which to objectively confirm his conjecture, but he suggested that without any friction to slow down an object in motion, its inherent tendency is to maintain its speed without the application of any additional force.

The Ptolemaic approach of using cycles and epicycles was becoming strained: there seemed to be no end to the mushrooming growth in complexity required to account for the observable phenomena. Johannes Kepler was the first person to abandon the tools of the Ptolemaic paradigm. He started to explore the possibility that the planet Mars might have an elliptical orbit rather than a circular one. Clearly, the angular velocity could not be constant, but it proved very difficult to find the formula describing the rate of change of the planet's angular velocity. After many years of calculations, Kepler arrived at what we now know as the law of equal areas.

Galileo's conjecture was merely that – a conjecture. So was Kepler's cosmology. But each conjecture increased the credibility of the other, and together, they changed the prevailing perceptions of the scientific community. Later, Newton showed that Kepler's three laws could all be derived from a single theory of motion and planetary motion. Newton solidified and unified the paradigm shift that Galileo and Kepler had initiated.

=== Coherence ===
One of the aims of science is to find models that will account for as many observations as possible within a coherent framework. Together, Galileo's rethinking of the nature of motion and Keplerian cosmology represented a coherent framework that was capable of rivaling the Aristotelian/Ptolemaic framework.

Once a paradigm shift has taken place, the textbooks are rewritten. Often the history of science too is rewritten, being presented as an inevitable process leading up to the current, established framework of thought. There is a prevalent belief that all hitherto-unexplained phenomena will in due course be accounted for in terms of this established framework. Kuhn states that scientists spend most (if not all) of their careers in a process of puzzle-solving. Their puzzle-solving is pursued with great tenacity, because the previous successes of the established paradigm tend to generate great confidence that the approach being taken guarantees that a solution to the puzzle exists, even though it may be very hard to find. Kuhn calls this process normal science.

As a paradigm is stretched to its limits, anomalies – failures of the current paradigm to take into account observed phenomena – accumulate. Their significance is judged by the practitioners of the discipline. Some anomalies may be dismissed as errors in observation, others as merely requiring small adjustments to the current paradigm that will be clarified in due course. Some anomalies resolve themselves spontaneously, having increased the available depth of insight along the way. But no matter how great or numerous the anomalies that persist, Kuhn observes, the practicing scientists will not lose faith in the established paradigm until a credible alternative is available; to lose faith in the solvability of the problems would in effect mean ceasing to be a scientist.

In any community of scientists, Kuhn states, there are some individuals who are bolder than most. These scientists, judging that a crisis exists, embark on what Kuhn calls revolutionary science, exploring alternatives to long-held, obvious-seeming assumptions. Occasionally this generates a rival to the established framework of thought. The new candidate paradigm will appear to be accompanied by numerous anomalies, partly because it is still so new and incomplete. The majority of the scientific community will oppose any conceptual change, and, Kuhn emphasizes, so they should. To fulfill its potential, a scientific community needs to contain both individuals who are bold and individuals who are conservative. There are many examples in the history of science in which confidence in the established frame of thought was eventually vindicated. Kuhn cites, as an example, that Alexis Clairaut, in 1750, was able to account accurately for the precession of the Moon's orbit using Newtonian theory, after sixty years of failed attempts. It is almost impossible to predict whether the anomalies in a candidate for a new paradigm will eventually be resolved. Those scientists who possess an exceptional ability to recognize a theory's potential will be the first whose preference is likely to shift in favour of the challenging paradigm. There typically follows a period in which there are adherents of both paradigms. In time, if the challenging paradigm is solidified and unified, it will replace the old paradigm, and a paradigm shift will have occurred.

Kuhn uses Norwood Russell Hanson's concept of 'theory-ladenness' to explain paradigm shifts. It shows that scientists may interpret the same phenomenon differently depending on the prevailing theory, and it reveals how perspectives on existing data change when a new paradigm emerges.

=== Phases ===
Kuhn explains the process of scientific change as the result of various phases of paradigm change.

- Phase 1 – It exists only once and is the pre-paradigm phase, in which there is no consensus on any particular theory. This phase is characterized by several incompatible and incomplete theories. Consequently, most scientific inquiry takes the form of lengthy books, as there is no common body of facts that may be taken for granted. When the actors in the pre-paradigm community eventually gravitate to one of these conceptual frameworks and ultimately to a widespread consensus on the appropriate choice of methods, terminology and on the kinds of experiment that are likely to contribute to increased insights, the old schools of thought disappear. The new paradigm leads to a more rigid definition of the research field, and those who are reluctant or unable to adapt are isolated or have to join rival groups.
- Phase 2 – Normal science begins, in which puzzles are solved within the context of the dominant paradigm. As long as there is consensus within the discipline, normal science continues. Over time, progress in normal science may reveal anomalies, facts that are difficult to explain within the context of the existing paradigm. While usually these anomalies are resolved, in some cases they may accumulate to the point where normal science becomes difficult and where weaknesses in the old paradigm are revealed.
- Phase 3 – If the paradigm proves chronically unable to account for anomalies, the community enters a crisis period. Crises are often resolved within the context of normal science. However, after significant efforts of normal science within a paradigm fail, science may enter the next phase.
- Phase 4 – Paradigm shift, or scientific revolution, is the phase in which the underlying assumptions of the field are reexamined and a new paradigm is established.
- Phase 5 – Post-revolution, the new paradigm's dominance is established and so scientists return to normal science, solving puzzles within the new paradigm.

A science may go through these cycles repeatedly, though Kuhn notes that it is a good thing for science that such shifts do not occur often or easily.

=== Incommensurability ===
According to Kuhn, the scientific paradigms preceding and succeeding a paradigm shift are so different that their theories are incommensurable—the new paradigm cannot be proven or disproven by the rules of the old paradigm, and vice versa. A later interpretation by Kuhn of "commensurable" versus "incommensurable" was as a distinction between "languages", namely, that statements in commensurable languages were translatable fully from one to the other, while in incommensurable languages, strict translation is not possible. The paradigm shift does not merely involve the revision or transformation of an individual theory, it changes the way terminology is defined, how the scientists in that field view their subject, and, perhaps most significantly, what questions are regarded as valid, and what rules are used to determine the truth of a particular theory. The new theories were not, as the scientists had previously thought, just extensions of old theories, but were instead completely new world views. Such incommensurability exists not just before and after a paradigm shift, but in the periods in between conflicting paradigms. It is simply not possible, according to Kuhn, to construct an impartial language that can be used to perform a neutral comparison between conflicting paradigms, because the very terms used are integral to the respective paradigms, and therefore have different connotations in each paradigm. The advocates of mutually exclusive paradigms are in a difficult position: "Though each may hope to convert the other to his way of seeing science and its problems, neither may hope to prove his case. The competition between paradigms is not the sort of battle that can be resolved by proofs." Scientists subscribing to different paradigms end up talking past one another.

Kuhn states that the probabilistic tools used by verificationists are inherently inadequate for the task of deciding between conflicting theories, since they belong to the very paradigms they seek to compare. Similarly, observations that are intended to falsify a statement will fall under one of the paradigms they are supposed to help compare, and will therefore also be inadequate for the task. According to Kuhn, the concept of falsifiability is unhelpful for understanding why and how science has developed as it has. In the practice of science, scientists will only consider the possibility that a theory has been falsified if an alternative theory is available that they judge credible. If there is not, scientists will continue to adhere to the established conceptual framework. If a paradigm shift has occurred, the textbooks will be rewritten to state that the previous theory has been falsified.

Kuhn further developed his ideas regarding incommensurability in the 1980s and 1990s. In his unpublished manuscript The Plurality of Worlds, Kuhn introduces the theory of kind concepts: sets of interrelated concepts that are characteristic of a time period in a science and differ in structure from the modern analogous kind concepts. These different structures imply different "taxonomies" of things and processes, and this difference in taxonomies constitutes incommensurability. This theory is strongly naturalistic and draws on developmental psychology to "found a quasi-transcendental theory of experience and of reality."

=== Exemplar ===
Kuhn introduced the concept of an exemplar in a postscript to the second edition of The Structure of Scientific Revolutions (1970). He noted that he was substituting the term "exemplars" for "paradigm", meaning the problems and solutions that students of a subject learn from the beginning of their education. For example, physicists might have as exemplars the inclined plane, Kepler's laws of planetary motion, or instruments like the calorimeter.

According to Kuhn, scientific practice alternates between periods of normal science and revolutionary science. During periods of normalcy, scientists tend to subscribe to a large body of interconnecting knowledge, methods, and assumptions which make up the reigning paradigm (see paradigm shift). Normal science presents a series of problems that are solved as scientists explore their field. The solutions to some of these problems become well known and are the exemplars of the field.

Those who study a scientific discipline are expected to know its exemplars. There is no fixed set of exemplars, but for a physicist today it would probably include the harmonic oscillator from mechanics and the hydrogen atom from quantum mechanics.

== Kuhn on scientific progress ==
The first edition of The Structure of Scientific Revolutions ended with a chapter titled "Progress through Revolutions", in which Kuhn spelled out his views on the nature of scientific progress. Since he considered problem solving (or "puzzle solving") to be a central element of science, Kuhn saw that for a new candidate paradigm to be accepted by a scientific community,

"First, the new candidate must seem to resolve some outstanding and generally recognized problem that can be met in no other way. Second, the new paradigm must promise to preserve a relatively large part of the concrete problem-solving ability that has accrued to science through its predecessors. Novelty for its own sake is not a desideratum in the sciences as it is in so many other creative fields. As a result, though new paradigms seldom or never possess all the capabilities of their predecessors, they usually preserve a great deal of the most concrete parts of past achievement and they always permit additional concrete problem-solutions besides."

— Kuhn (1962, p. 169)

In the second edition, Kuhn added a postscript in which he elaborated his ideas on the nature of scientific progress. He described a thought experiment involving an observer who has the opportunity to inspect an assortment of theories, each corresponding to a single stage in a succession of theories. What if the observer is presented with these theories without any explicit indication of their chronological order? Kuhn anticipates that it will be possible to reconstruct their chronology on the basis of the theories' scope and content, because the more recent a theory is, the better it will be as an instrument for solving the kinds of puzzle that scientists aim to solve. Kuhn remarked: "That is not a relativist's position, and it displays the sense in which I am a convinced believer in scientific progress." (Note: Discussed further in Weinberger (2012))

== Influence and reception ==
The Structure of Scientific Revolutions has been credited with producing the kind of "paradigm shift" Kuhn discussed. Since the book's publication, over one million copies have been sold, including translations into sixteen different languages. (Note: Figures cited in Horgan (1991).) In 1987, it was reported to be the twentieth-century book most frequently cited in the period 1976–1983 in the arts and the humanities.

=== Philosophy ===
The first extensive review of The Structure of Scientific Revolutions was authored by Dudley Shapere, a philosopher who interpreted Kuhn's work as a continuation of the anti-positivist sentiment of other philosophers of science, including Paul Feyerabend and Norwood Russell Hanson. Shapere noted the book's influence on the philosophical landscape of the time, calling it "a sustained attack on the prevailing image of scientific change as a linear process of ever-increasing knowledge". According to the philosopher Michael Ruse, Kuhn discredited the ahistorical and prescriptive approach to the philosophy of science of Ernest Nagel's The Structure of Science (1961). Kuhn's book sparked a historicist "revolt against positivism" (the so-called "historical turn in philosophy of science" which looked to the history of science as a source of data for developing a philosophy of science), although this may not have been Kuhn's intention; in fact, he had already approached the prominent positivist Rudolf Carnap about having his work published in the International Encyclopedia of Unified Science. The philosopher Robert C. Solomon noted that Kuhn's views have often been suggested to have an affinity to those of Georg Wilhelm Friedrich Hegel. Kuhn's view of scientific knowledge, as expounded in The Structure of Scientific Revolutions, has been compared to the views of the philosopher Michel Foucault.

=== Sociology ===
The first field to claim descent from Kuhn's ideas was the sociology of scientific knowledge. Sociologists working within this new field, including Harry Collins and Steven Shapin, used Kuhn's emphasis on the role of non-evidential community factors in scientific development to argue against logical empiricism, which discouraged inquiry into the social aspects of scientific communities. These sociologists expanded upon Kuhn's ideas, arguing that scientific judgment is determined by social factors, such as professional interests and political ideologies.

Barry Barnes detailed the connection between the sociology of scientific knowledge and Kuhn in his book T. S. Kuhn and Social Science. In particular, Kuhn's ideas regarding science occurring within an established framework informed Barnes's own ideas regarding finitism, a theory wherein meaning is continuously changed (even during periods of normal science) by its usage within the social framework.

The Structure of Scientific Revolutions elicited a number of reactions from the broader sociological community. Following the book's publication, some sociologists expressed the belief that the field of sociology had not yet developed a unifying paradigm, and should therefore strive towards homogenization. Others argued that the field was in the midst of normal science, and speculated that a new revolution would soon emerge. Some sociologists, including John Urry, doubted that Kuhn's theory, which addressed the development of natural science, was necessarily relevant to sociological development.

=== Economics ===
Developments in the field of economics are often expressed and legitimized in Kuhnian terms. For instance, neoclassical economists have claimed "to be at the second stage [normal science], and to have been there for a very long time – since Adam Smith, according to some accounts (Hollander, 1987), or Jevons according to others (Hutchison, 1978)". In the 1970s, post-Keynesian economists denied the coherence of the neoclassical paradigm, claiming that their own paradigm would ultimately become dominant.

While perhaps less explicit, Kuhn's influence remains apparent in recent economics. For instance, the abstract of Olivier Blanchard's paper "The State of Macro" (2008) begins:

For a long while after the explosion of macroeconomics in the 1970s, the field looked like a battlefield. Over time however, largely because facts do not go away, a largely shared vision both of fluctuations and of methodology has emerged. Not everything is fine. Like all revolutions, this one has come with the destruction of some knowledge, and suffers from extremism and herding.

— Blanchard (2009, p. 1)

=== Political science ===
In 1974, The Structure of Scientific Revolutions was ranked as the second most frequently used book in political science courses focused on scope and methods. In particular, Kuhn's theory has been used by political scientists to critique behavioralism, which claims that accurate political statements must be both testable and falsifiable. The book also proved popular with political scientists embroiled in debates about whether a set of formulations put forth by a political scientist constituted a theory, or something else.

The changes that occur in politics, society and business are often expressed in Kuhnian terms, however poor their parallel with the practice of science may seem to scientists and historians of science. The terms "paradigm" and "paradigm shift" have become such notorious clichés and buzzwords that they are sometimes viewed as effectively devoid of content.

== Criticisms ==
Front cover of Imre Lakatos and Alan Musgrave, ed., Criticism and the Growth of Knowledge

The Structure of Scientific Revolutions was soon criticized by Kuhn's colleagues in the history and philosophy of science. In 1965, a special symposium on the book was held at an International Colloquium on the Philosophy of Science that took place at Bedford College, London, and was chaired by Karl Popper. The symposium led to the publication of the symposium's presentations plus other essays, most of them critical, which eventually appeared in an influential volume of essays. Kuhn expressed the opinion that his critics' readings of his book were so inconsistent with his own understanding of it that he was "tempted to posit the existence of two Thomas Kuhns," one the author of his book, the other the individual who had been criticized in the symposium by Professors Popper, Feyerabend, Lakatos, Toulmin and Watkins.

A number of the included essays question the existence of normal science. In his essay, Feyerabend suggests that Kuhn's conception of normal science fits organized crime as well as it does science. Popper expresses distaste with the entire premise of Kuhn's book, writing, "the idea of turning for enlightenment concerning the aims of science, and its possible progress, to sociology or to psychology (or ... to the history of science) is surprising and disappointing."

=== Concept of paradigm ===
Stephen Toulmin defined paradigm as "the set of common beliefs and agreements shared between scientists about how problems should be understood and addressed". In his 1972 work, Human Understanding, he argued that a more realistic picture of science than that presented in The Structure of Scientific Revolutions would admit the fact that revisions in science take place much more frequently, and are much less dramatic than can be explained by the model of revolution/normal science. In Toulmin's view, such revisions occur quite often during periods of what Kuhn would call "normal science". For Kuhn to explain such revisions in terms of the non-paradigmatic puzzle solutions of normal science, he would need to delineate what is perhaps an implausibly sharp distinction between paradigmatic and non-paradigmatic science.

One of the early critics of Kuhn, Norwood Russell Hanson, criticized Kuhn's paradigm shift theory as conceptually circular and therefore unfalsifiable.

=== Incommensurability of paradigms ===
In a series of texts published in the early 1970s, Carl R. Kordig asserted a position somewhere between that of Kuhn and the older philosophy of science. His criticism of the Kuhnian position was that the incommensurability thesis was too radical, and that this made it impossible to explain the confrontation of scientific theories that actually occurs. According to Kordig, it is in fact possible to admit the existence of revolutions and paradigm shifts in science while still recognizing that theories belonging to different paradigms can be compared and confronted on the plane of observation. Those who accept the incommensurability thesis do not do so because they admit the discontinuity of paradigms, but because they attribute a radical change in meanings to such shifts.

Kordig maintains that there is a common observational plane. For example, when Kepler and Tycho Brahe are trying to explain the relative variation of the distance of the Sun from the horizon at sunrise, both see the same thing (the same configuration is focused on the retina of each individual). This is just one example of the fact that "rival scientific theories share some observations, and therefore some meanings". Kordig suggests that with this approach, he is not reintroducing the distinction between observations and theory in which the former is assigned a privileged and neutral status, but that it is possible to affirm more simply the fact that, even if no sharp distinction exists between theory and observations, this does not imply that there are no comprehensible differences at the two extremes of this polarity.

At a secondary level, for Kordig there is a common plane of inter-paradigmatic standards or shared norms that permit the effective confrontation of rival theories.

In 1973, Hartry Field published an article that also sharply criticized Kuhn's idea of incommensurability. In particular, he took issue with this passage from Kuhn:

"Newtonian mass is immutably conserved; that of Einstein is convertible into energy. Only at very low relative velocities can the two masses be measured in the same way, and even then they must not be conceived as if they were the same thing."

— Kuhn (1970)

Field takes this idea of incommensurability between the same terms in different theories one step further. Instead of attempting to identify a persistence of the reference of terms in different theories, Field's analysis emphasizes the indeterminacy of reference within individual theories. Field takes the example of the term "mass", and asks what exactly "mass" means in modern post-relativistic physics. He finds that there are at least two different definitions:

1. Relativistic mass: the mass of a particle is equal to the total energy of the particle divided by the speed of light squared. Since the total energy of a particle in relation to one system of reference differs from the total energy in relation to other systems of reference, while the speed of light remains constant in all systems, it follows that the mass of a particle has different values in different systems of reference.
2. "Real" mass: the mass of a particle is equal to the non-kinetic energy of a particle divided by the speed of light squared. Since non-kinetic energy is the same in all systems of reference, and the same is true of light, it follows that the mass of a particle has the same value in all systems of reference.

Projecting this distinction backwards in time onto Newtonian dynamics, we can formulate the following two hypotheses:

- HR: the term "mass" in Newtonian theory denotes relativistic mass.
- Hp: the term "mass" in Newtonian theory denotes "real" mass.

According to Field, it is impossible to decide which of these two affirmations is true. Prior to the theory of relativity, the term "mass" was referentially indeterminate. But this does not mean that the term "mass" did not have a different meaning than it now has. The problem is not one of meaning but of reference. The reference of such terms as mass is only partially determined: we do not really know how Newton intended his use of this term to be applied. As a consequence, neither of the two terms fully denotes (refers). It follows that it is improper to maintain that a term has changed its reference during a scientific revolution; it is more appropriate to describe terms such as "mass" as "having undergone a denotional refinement".

In 1973, Donald Davidson objected that the concept of incommensurable scientific paradigms competing with each other is logically inconsistent. In his article Davidson goes well beyond the semantic version of the incommensurability thesis: to make sense of the idea of a language independent of translation requires a distinction between conceptual schemes and the content organized by such schemes. But, Davidson argues, no coherent sense can be made of the idea of a conceptual scheme, and therefore no sense may be attached to the idea of an untranslatable language.

The philosopher Tim Maudlin observes that incommensurability must have limits or "else the need to revise theories would never arise."

=== Incommensurability and perception ===
The close connection between the interpretationalist hypothesis and a holistic conception of beliefs is at the root of the notion of the dependence of perception on theory, a central concept in The Structure of Scientific Revolutions. Kuhn maintained that the perception of the world depends on how the percipient conceives the world: two scientists who witness the same phenomenon and are steeped in two radically different theories will see two different things (Theory-ladenness). According to this view, our interpretation of the world determines what we see.

Jerry Fodor attempts to establish that this theoretical paradigm is fallacious and misleading by demonstrating the impenetrability of perception to the background knowledge of subjects. The strongest case can be based on evidence from experimental cognitive psychology, namely the persistence of perceptual illusions. Knowing that the lines in the Müller-Lyer illusion are equal does not prevent one from continuing to see one line as being longer than the other. This impenetrability of the information elaborated by the mental modules limits the scope of interpretationism.

In epistemology, for example, the criticism of what Fodor calls the interpretationist hypothesis accounts for the common-sense intuition (on which naïve physics is based) of the independence of reality from the conceptual categories of the experimenter. If the processes of elaboration of the mental modules are in fact independent of the background theories, then it is possible to maintain the realist view that two scientists who embrace two radically diverse theories see the world exactly in the same manner even if they interpret it differently. The point is that it is necessary to distinguish between observations and the perceptual fixation of beliefs. While it is beyond doubt that the second process involves the holistic relationship between beliefs, the first is largely independent of the background beliefs of individuals.

Other critics, such as Israel Scheffler, Hilary Putnam and Saul Kripke, have focused on the Fregean distinction between sense and reference in order to defend scientific realism. Scheffler contends that Kuhn confuses the meanings of terms such as "mass" with their referents. While their meanings may very well differ, their referents (the objects or entities to which they correspond in the external world) remain fixed.

In this regard, there is also a discussion of genetic fallacy in terms of how to evaluate theories.

== Subsequent commentary by Kuhn ==
In 1995 Kuhn argued that the Darwinian metaphor in the book should have been taken more seriously than it had been.

== Awards and honors ==
- 1998 Modern Library 100 Best Nonfiction: The Board's List (69)
- 1999 National Review 100 Best Nonfiction Books of the Century (25)

== Publication history ==
- Kuhn, Thomas S. (1962). The Structure of Scientific Revolutions (1st ed.). University of Chicago Press. pp. 172. LCCN 62019621.
- Kuhn, Thomas S. (1970). The Structure of Scientific Revolutions. Enlarged (2nd ed.). University of Chicago Press. pp. 210. ISBN 978-0-226-45803-8. LCCN 70107472.
- Kuhn, Thomas S. (1996). The Structure of Scientific Revolutions (3rd ed.). University of Chicago Press. ISBN 978-0-226-45807-6. LCCN 96013195.
- Kuhn, Thomas S. (2012). The Structure of Scientific Revolutions. 50th anniversary. Ian Hacking (intro.) (4th ed.). University of Chicago Press. p. 264. ISBN 978-0-226-45811-3. LCCN 2011042476.
- Kuhn, Thomas S. (2020). The Structure of Scientific Revolutions. Marcus du Sautoy (foreword); Ian Hacking (intro.) (Folio Society ed.). Folio Society (licensed by The University of Chicago Press). p. 169.

== Bibliography ==
- Barnes, Barry (1982). T. S. Kuhn and Social Science. New York City: Columbia University Press. ISBN 9780231054362.
- Bilton, Tony; et al. (2002). Introductory Sociology (4th ed.). New York: Palgrave Macmillan. p. 422. ISBN 978-0-333-94571-1.*
- Bird, Alexander (2013). "Thomas Kuhn". The Stanford Encyclopedia of Philosophy. Metaphysics Research Lab, Stanford University.
- Bird, Alexander; Ladyman, James (2013). Arguing about Science. Routledge. ISBN 9780415492294.
- Blanchard, Olivier J. (2009). "The State of Macro". Annual Review of Economics. 1 (1): 209–228. doi:10.3386/w14259.
- Conant, James; Haugeland, John (2002). "Editors' introduction". The Road Since Structure: Philosophical Essays, 1970-1993, with an Autobiographical Interview (2nd ed.). University of Chicago Press. p. 4. ISBN 978-0226457994.
- Daston, Lorraine (2012). "Structure". Historical Studies in the Natural Sciences. 42 (5): 496–499. doi:10.1525/hsns.2012.42.5.496. JSTOR 10.1525/hsns.2012.42.5.496.
- Davidson, Donald (1973). "On the Very Idea of a Conceptual Scheme". Proceedings and Addresses of the American Philosophical Association. 47: 5–20. doi:10.2307/3129898. JSTOR 3129898.
- de Gelder, Beatrice (1989). "Granny, The Naked Emperor and the Second Cognitive Revolution". The Cognitive Turn: Sociological and Psychological Perspectives on Science. Sociology of the Sciences Yearbook. Vol. 13. Springer Netherlands. pp. 97–100. ISBN 978-0-7923-0306-0.
- Dolby, R. G. A. (1971). "Reviewed Work: Criticism and the Growth of Knowledge. Proceedings of the International Colloquium in the Philosophy of Science, London 1965, Volume 4". The British Journal for the History of Science. 5 (4): 400. doi:10.1017/s0007087400011626. JSTOR 4025383. S2CID 246613909.
- Feloni, Richard (March 17, 2015). "Why Mark Zuckerberg wants everyone to read this landmark philosophy book from the 1960s". Business Insider.
- Ferretti, F. (2001). Jerry A. Fodor. Rome: Editori Laterza. ISBN 978-88-420-6220-2.
- Field, Hartry (August 1973). "Theory Change and the Indeterminacy of Reference". The Journal of Philosophy. 70 (14): 462–481. doi:10.2307/2025110. JSTOR 2025110.
- Fleck, Ludwik (1979). Genesis and Development of a Scientific Fact. Chicago, Illinois: University of Chicago Press.
- Fleck, Ludwik (1935). Entstehung und Entwicklung einer wissenschaftlichen Tatsache. Einführung in die Lehre vom Denkstil und Denkkollektiv [Genesis and development of a scientific fact. Introduction to the study of thinking style and thinking collective] (in German). Verlagsbuchhandlung, Basel: Schwabe.
- Flood, Alison (March 19, 2015). "Mark Zuckerberg book club tackles the philosophy of science". The Guardian.
- Forster, Malcolm. "Kuhn's Structure of Scientific Revolutions". philosophy.wisc.edu. Archived from the original on September 24, 2017.
- Fox, Charles (1974). "Whose Works Must Graduate Students Read?". A NEW Political Science: 19.
- Fulford, Robert (June 5, 1999). "Robert Fulford's column about the word "paradigm"". Globe and Mail.
- Fuller, Steve (1992). "Being There with Thomas Kuhn: A Parable for Postmodern Times". History and Theory. 31 (3): 241–275. doi:10.2307/2505370. JSTOR 2505370.
- Garfield, Eugene (April 20, 1987). "A Different Sort of Great Books List: The 50 Twentieth-Century Works Most Cited in the Arts & Humanities Citation Index, 1976–1983" (PDF). Essays of an Information Scientist (1987 Current Contents). 10 (16): 3–7.
- Gattei, Stefano (2008). Thomas Kuhn's 'Linguistic Turn' and the Legacy of Logical Empiricism: Incommensurability, Rationality and the Search for Truth (1 ed.). London: Routledge. p. 292. doi:10.4324/9781315236124. ISBN 9781315236124.
- Horgan, John (May 1991). "Profile: Reluctant Revolutionary—Thomas S. Kuhn Unleashed 'Paradigm' on the World". Scientific American. 40.
- Hoyningen-Huene, Paul (March 19, 2015). "Kuhn's Development Before and After Structure". In Devlin, W.; Bokulich, A. (eds.). Kuhn's Structure of Scientific Revolutions - 50 Years on. Boston Studies in the Philosophy and History of Science. Vol. 311. Springer International Publishing. pp. 185–195. doi:10.1007/978-3-319-13383-6_13. ISBN 978-3-319-13382-9.
- Kaiser, David (2012). "In retrospect: the structure of scientific revolutions". Nature. 484 (7393): 164–166. Bibcode:2012Natur.484..164K. doi:10.1038/484164a. hdl:1721.1/106157.
- King, J. E. (2002). A History of Post Keynesian Economics Since 1936. Cheltenham, UK: Edward Elgar. p. 250. ISBN 978-1843766506.
- Kordig, Carl R. (December 1973). "Discussion: Observational Invariance". Philosophy of Science. 40 (4): 558–569. doi:10.1086/288565. JSTOR 186288. S2CID 224833690.
- Korta, Kepa; Larrazabal, Jesus M., eds. (2004). Truth, Rationality, Cognition, and Music: Proceedings of the Seventh International Colloquium on Cognitive Science. Kluwer Academic Publishers.
- Kuhn, Thomas (1987), "What Are Scientific Revolutions?", in Kruger, Lorenz; Daston, Lorraine J.; Heidelberger, Michael (eds.), The Probabilistic Revolution, vol. 1: Ideas in History, Cambridge, Massachusetts: MIT Press, pp. 719–720
- Kuhn, Thomas; Baltas, Aristides; Gavroglu, Kostas; Kindi, Vassiliki (October 1995). A Discussion with Thomas S. Kuhn (Interview). Athens. Event occurs at 1m41s. Archived from the original on November 8, 2020. "I would now argue very strongly that the Darwinian metaphor at the end of the book is right, and should have been taken more seriously than it was – and nobody took it seriously."
- Lakatos, Imre; Musgrave, Alan, eds. (1970). Criticism and the Growth of Knowledge. International Colloquium in the Philosophy of Science, London, 1965. Vol. 4. Cambridge University Press. p. 292. doi:10.1017/CBO9781139171434. ISBN 9780521096232.
- Longino, Helen (April 12, 2002). "The Social Dimensions of Scientific Knowledge". Stanford Encyclopedia of Philosophy. The Metaphysics Research Lab, Center for the Study of Language and Information (CSLI), Stanford University.
- McFedries, Paul (May 7, 2001). The Complete Idiot's Guide to a Smart Vocabulary (1st ed.). Alpha Books. pp. 142–143. ISBN 978-0-02-863997-0.
- Mößner, Nicola (June 2011). "Thought styles and paradigms—a comparative study of Ludwik Fleck and Thomas S. Kuhn". Studies in History and Philosophy of Science. 42 (2): 362–371. Bibcode:2011SHPSA..42..362M. doi:10.1016/j.shpsa.2010.12.002. S2CID 146515142.
- National Review (May 3, 1999). "The 100 Best Non-Fiction Books of The Century". National Review.
- Naughton, John (August 18, 2012). "Thomas Kuhn: the man who changed the way the world looked at science". The Guardian.
- Ricci, David (1977). "Reading Thomas Kuhn in the Post-Behavioral Era". The Western Political Quarterly. 30 (1): 7–34. doi:10.1177/106591297703000102. JSTOR 448209. S2CID 144412975.
- Ruse, Michael (2005). Honderich, Ted (ed.). The Oxford Companion to Philosophy. Oxford: Oxford University Press. ISBN 978-0-19-926479-7.
- Scheffler, Israel (January 1, 1982). Science and Subjectivity. Indianapolis, Indiana: Hackett Publishing Company. p. 166. ISBN 9780915145300.
- Shapere, Dudley (1964). "The Structure of Scientific Revolutions". The Philosophical Review. 73 (3): 383–394. doi:10.2307/2183664. JSTOR 2183664.
- Shea, William (April 2001). Copernico (in Italian). Milan: Le Scienze.
- Solomon, Robert C. (1995). In the Spirit of Hegel: A Study of G. W. F. Hegel's Phenomenology of Spirit. New York: Oxford University Press. p. 359. ISBN 978-0-19-503650-3.
- Stephens, Jerome (1973). "The Kuhnian Paradigm and Political Inquiry: An Appraisal". American Journal of Political Science. 17 (3): 467–488. doi:10.2307/2110740. JSTOR 2110740.
- Toulmin, Stephen (1972). Human Understanding. Oxford: Clarendon Press. ISBN 978-0-19-824361-8.
- Urry, John (1973). "Thomas S. Kuhn as Sociologist of Knowledge". The British Journal of Sociology. 24 (4): 463–464. doi:10.2307/589735. JSTOR 589735.
- Weinberger, David (April 22, 2012). "Shift Happens". The Chronicle of Higher Education.
- Wray, K. Brad (2011). Kuhn's Evolutionary Social Epistemology. Cambridge University Press. ISBN 9781139503464.
- Ziman, J. M. (1982). "T. S. Kuhn and Social Science. Barry Barnes". Isis (book review). 73 (4). University of Chicago Press: 572. doi:10.1086/353123.

== See also ==
- Epistemological rupture
- Groupthink
- Scientific Revolution
