= Daiwie Fu =

Daiwie Fu (first name pronunciated from Taiwanese Hokkien, Chinese: 傅大為; pinyin: Fù Dàwéi; Wade–Giles: Fu Ta-wei, born September 1953) is a Taiwanese academic, and the founding editor-in-chief of the academic science and technology studies (STS) journal East Asian Science, Technology and Society.

He was formerly distinguished professor of the graduate institute of STS, now emeritus professor, in National Yang-Ming Chao-Tong University. His research areas are science and technology studies, gender and medicine in modern Taiwan, gender and science, East Asian STS, history and philosophy of science, and the history of Chinese science (mainly on biji, Mengxi Bitan and the cultural history of science in the Song Dynasty). He has published papers in Chinese, English, Italian, Korean, and Japanese. He published three academic books, several social criticisms, and has founded several Taiwanese magazines and academic journals, including the radical journal, Taiwan: a Radical Quarterly in Social Studies. Since the lifting of Taiwan's martial law, he has also participated in social activist movements.
