= Dudley Shapere =

American philosopher

- Born: May 27, 1928; Harlingen, Texas, U.S.
- Died: December 26, 2016 (aged 92); Winston-Salem, North Carolina, U.S.
- Spouse: Hannah Hardgrave
- Parent(s): Abraham Dudley Shapere (1892-1941) and Corinne Pupkin

Education
- Education: Harvard University (PhD)

Philosophical work
- Era: Contemporary philosophy
- Region: Western philosophy
- School: Analytic philosophy
- Institutions: Wake Forest College, Ohio State University, University of Chicago, University of Illinois, University of Maryland
- Main interests: philosophy of science

Dudley Shapere (May 27, 1928 – December 26, 2016) was an American philosopher and Reynolds Professor Emeritus of the Philosophy and History of Science at Wake Forest College. He is known for his works on philosophy of science. He received the Quantrell Award.

== Books ==
- Reason and the Search for Knowledge. Boston Studies in the Philosophy of Science, Vol. 78. Dordrecht: D. Reidel Publishing Company 1984
- Philosophical Problems of Natural Science (ed.), Collier-Macmillan 1965
