= Normal science =

Regular work of scientists

Normal science, identified and elaborated on by Thomas Samuel Kuhn in The Structure of Scientific Revolutions, is the regular work of scientists theorizing, observing, and experimenting within a settled paradigm or explanatory framework. Regarding science as puzzle-solving, Kuhn explained normal science as slowly accumulating detail in accord with established broad theory, without questioning or challenging the underlying assumptions of that theory.

== Route to normal science ==
Kuhn stressed that historically, the route to normal science could be a difficult one. Prior to the formation of a shared paradigm or research consensus, would-be scientists were reduced to the accumulation of random facts and unverified observations, in the manner recorded by Pliny the Elder or Francis Bacon, while simultaneously beginning the foundations of their field from scratch through a plethora of competing theories.

Arguably at least the social sciences remain at such a pre-paradigmatic level today.

== Normal science at work ==
Kuhn considered that the bulk of scientific work was that done by the 'normal' scientist, as they engaged with the threefold task of articulating the paradigm, precisely evaluating key paradigmatic facts, and testing those new points at which the theoretical paradigm is open to empirical appraisal.

Paradigms are central to Kuhn's conception of normal science. Scientists derive rules from paradigms, which also guide research by providing a framework for action that encompasses all the values, techniques, and theories shared by the members of a scientific community. Paradigms gain recognition from more successfully solving acute problems than their competitors. Normal science aims to improve the match between a paradigm's predictions and the facts of interest to a paradigm. It does not aim to discover new phenomena.

According to Kuhn, normal science encompasses three classes of scientific problems. The first class of scientific problems is the determination of significant fact, such as the position and magnitude of stars in different galaxies. When astronomers use special telescopes to verify Copernican predictions, they engage the second class: the matching of facts with theory, an attempt to demonstrate agreement between the two. Improving the value of the gravitational constant is an example of articulating a paradigm theory, which is the third class of scientific problems.

== Breakdown of consensus ==
The normal scientist presumes that all values, techniques, and theories falling within the expectations of the prevailing paradigm are accurate. Anomalies represent challenges to be puzzled out and solved within the prevailing paradigm. Only if an anomaly or series of anomalies resists successful deciphering long enough and for enough members of the scientific community will the paradigm itself gradually come under challenge during what Kuhn deems a crisis of normal science. If the paradigm is unsalvageable, it will be subjected to a paradigm shift.

Kuhn lays out the progression of normal science that culminates in scientific discovery at the time of a paradigm shift: first, one must become aware of an anomaly in nature that the prevailing paradigm cannot explain. Then, one must conduct an extended exploration of this anomaly. The crisis only ends when one discards the old paradigm and successfully accommodates the original anomaly within a new paradigm. The scientific community embraces a new set of expectations and theories that govern the work of normal science. Kuhn calls such discoveries scientific revolutions. Successive paradigms replace each other and are necessarily incompatible with each other.

In this way however, according to Kuhn, normal science possesses a built-in mechanism that ensures the relaxation of the restrictions that previously bound research, whenever the paradigm from which they derive ceases to function effectively. Kuhn's framework restricts the permissibility of paradigm falsification to moments of scientific discovery.

== Criticism ==
Kuhn's normal science is characterized by upheaval over cycles of puzzle-solving and scientific revolution, as opposed to cumulative improvement. In Kuhn's historicism, moving from one paradigm to the next completely changes the universe of scientific assumptions. Imre Lakatos has accused Kuhn of falling back on irrationalism to explain scientific progress. Lakatos relates Kuhnian scientific change to a mystical or religious conversion ungoverned by reason.

With the aim of presenting scientific revolutions as rational progress, Lakatos provided an alternative framework of scientific inquiry in his paper Falsification and the Methodology of Scientific Research Programmes. His model of the research programme preserves cumulative progress in science where Kuhn's model of successive irreconcilable paradigms in normal science does not. Lakatos' basic unit of analysis is not a singular theory or paradigm, but rather the entire research programme that contains the relevant series of testable theories. Each theory within a research programme has the same common assumptions and is supported by a belt of more modest auxiliary hypotheses that serve to explain away potential threats to the theory's core assumptions. Lakatos evaluates problem shifts, changes to auxiliary hypotheses, by their ability to produce new facts, better predictions, or additional explanations. Lakatos' conception of a scientific revolution involves the replacement of degenerative research programmes by progressive research programmes. Rival programmes persist as minority views.

Lakatos is also concerned that Kuhn's position may result in the controversial position of relativism, for Kuhn accepts multiple conceptions of the world under different paradigms. Although the developmental process he describes in science is characterized by an increasingly detailed and refined understanding of nature, Kuhn does not conceive of science as a process of evolution towards any goal or telos. He has noted his own sparing use of the word truth in his writing.

An additional consequence of Kuhn's relativism, which poses a problem for the philosophy of science, is his blurred demarcation between science and non-science. Unlike Karl Popper's deductive method of falsification, under Kuhn, scientific discoveries that do not fit the established paradigm do not immediately falsify the paradigm. They are treated as anomalies within the paradigm that warrant further research, until a scientific revolution refutes the entire paradigm.

== See also ==
- Demarcation problem
- Henri Poincaré
- Interpretive communities
- Jerome Ravetz
- Post-normal science
- Scientific community
- Scientific method
- Reification (fallacy)
