= Thomas Kuhn =

American philosopher (1922–1996)

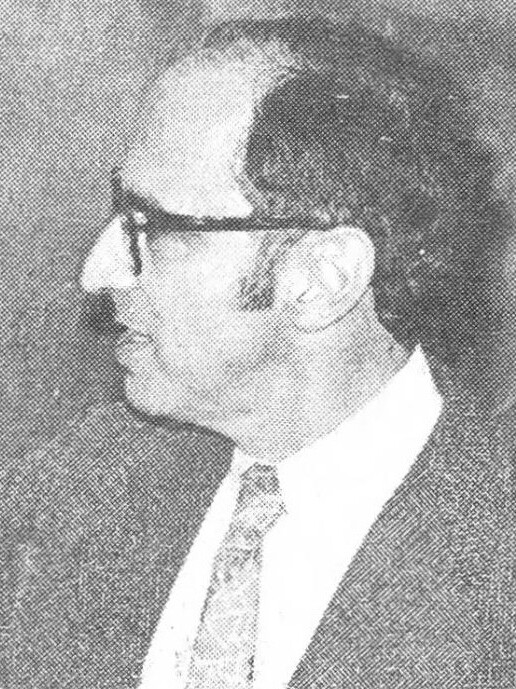
- Kuhn in 1977
- Born: Thomas Samuel Kuhn; July 18, 1922; Cincinnati, Ohio, US
- Died: June 17, 1996 (aged 73); Cambridge, Massachusetts, US

Education
- Education: Harvard University (BSc, MSc, PhD)
- Thesis: The Cohesive Energy of Monovalent Metals as a Function of Their Atomic Quantum Defects

Philosophical work
- Era: 20th-century philosophy
- Region: Western philosophy: American philosophy
- School: Analytic; Historical turn Historiographical externalism
- Institutions: Harvard University; University of California, Berkeley; Princeton University; Massachusetts Institute of Technology
- Main interests: Philosophy of science History of science
- Notable ideas: Paradigm shift; Incommensurability; Normal science; Kuhn loss; Transcendental nominalism

Thomas Samuel Kuhn (/kuːn/; July 18, 1922 – June 17, 1996) was an American historian and philosopher of science whose 1962 book The Structure of Scientific Revolutions was influential in both academic and popular circles. The book popularized the term paradigm shift, which has since become an English-language idiom.

Kuhn made several claims concerning the progress of scientific knowledge: that scientific fields undergo periodic "paradigm shifts" rather than solely progressing in a linear and continuous way, and that these paradigm shifts open up new approaches to understanding what scientists would never have considered valid before; and that the notion of scientific truth, at any given moment, cannot be established solely by objective criteria but is defined by a consensus of a scientific community. Competing paradigms are frequently incommensurable; that is, there is no one-to-one correspondence of assumptions and terms. Thus, our comprehension of science can never rely wholly upon "objectivity" alone. Science must account for subjective perspectives as well, since all objective conclusions are ultimately founded upon the subjective conditioning/worldview of its researchers and participants.

== Biography ==
=== Early life, family and education ===
Kuhn was born in Cincinnati, Ohio, in 1922 to Minette Stroock Kuhn and Samuel L. Kuhn, an industrial engineer, both Jewish though non-observant.

The family moved to Manhattan when he was an infant. From kindergarten through fifth grade, he was educated at Lincoln School, a private progressive school in Manhattan, which stressed independent thinking rather than learning facts and subjects. The family then moved 40 mi (64 km) north to the small town of Croton-on-Hudson, New York, where, once again, he attended a private progressive school – Hessian Hills School. Here, in sixth through ninth grade, he learned to love mathematics. He left Hessian Hills in 1937 and spent one year at the Solebury School before attending The Taft School in Watertown, Connecticut, graduating in 1940.

He obtained his BSc degree in physics from Harvard College in 1943. As an undergraduate, he wrote for The Harvard Crimson and headed its editorial board. He also obtained MSc and PhD degrees in physics in 1946 and 1949, respectively, under the supervision of John Van Vleck, after a short period of World War II war work with Van Vleck at Harvard's secret Radio Research Laboratory that included travel to England, France, and Germany.

=== Career ===
Kuhn began his teaching career with a course in the history of science at Harvard from 1948 until 1957 as assistant professor of General Education and History of Science at the suggestion of university president James B. Conant. He was a Harvard Junior Fellow 1948–1951 and, as he states in the first pages of the preface to the second edition of The Structure of Scientific Revolutions, these three years of total academic freedom were crucial in allowing him to switch from studying physics to studying the history of science and philosophy of science. However, Conant's influence at Harvard declined rapidly over the course of the 50s and the general education program was refocused, and Kuhn was rejected for tenure in 1957.

Kuhn taught next, after Harvard, at the University of California, Berkeley, in both the philosophy department and the history department; he was named Professor of History of Science in 1961. At Berkeley, Kuhn served as director of the National Science Foundation project Sources for the History of Quantum Physics 1961–1964. Kuhn interviewed and tape recorded Danish physicist Niels Bohr the day before Bohr's death. At Berkeley, he wrote and published (in 1962) his best known and most influential work: The Structure of Scientific Revolutions.

In 1964, he joined Princeton University as the M. Taylor Pyne Professor of Philosophy and History of Science. He served as the president of the History of Science Society from 1969 to 1970. He was a member of Princeton's Institute for Advanced Study 1972–1979. In 1978–79, he was a fellow at the New York Institute for the Humanities. In 1979 he joined the Massachusetts Institute of Technology (MIT) as the Laurance S. Rockefeller Professor of Philosophy, remaining there until becoming emeritus in 1991. He served as president of the Philosophy of Science Association 1989–1990.

=== Death ===
In 1994, Kuhn was diagnosed with cancer of the bronchial tubes and throat. He died in 1996.

== Philosophy ==
=== The Structure of Scientific Revolutions ===
The Structure of Scientific Revolutions (SSR) was originally printed as an article in the International Encyclopedia of Unified Science, published by the logical positivists of the Vienna Circle. In this book, possibly influenced by the fundamental work of Ludwik Fleck, Kuhn argued that science does not progress via a linear accumulation of new knowledge, but undergoes periodic revolutions, also called "paradigm shifts" (although he did not coin the phrase, he did contribute to its increase in popularity), in which the nature of scientific inquiry within a particular field is abruptly transformed. In general, science is broken up into three distinct stages. Prescience, which lacks a central paradigm, comes first. This is followed by "normal science", when scientists attempt to enlarge the central paradigm by "puzzle-solving". Guided by the paradigm, normal science is extremely productive: "when the paradigm is successful, the profession will have solved problems that its members could scarcely have imagined and would never have undertaken without commitment to the paradigm".

In regard to experimentation and collection of data with a view toward solving problems through the commitment to a paradigm, Kuhn states:

The operations and measurements that a scientist undertakes in the laboratory are not "the given" of experience but rather "the collected with difficulty." They are not what the scientist sees—at least not before his research is well advanced and his attention focused. Rather, they are concrete indices to the content of more elementary perceptions, and as such they are selected for the close scrutiny of normal research only because they promise opportunity for the fruitful elaboration of an accepted paradigm. Far more clearly than the immediate experience from which they in part derive, operations and measurements are paradigm-determined. Science does not deal in all possible laboratory manipulations. Instead, it selects those relevant to the juxtaposition of a paradigm with the immediate experience that that paradigm has partially determined. As a result, scientists with different paradigms engage in different concrete laboratory manipulations.

During the period of normal science, the failure of a result to conform to the paradigm is seen not as refuting the paradigm, but as the mistake of the researcher, contra Karl Popper's falsifiability criterion. As anomalous results build up, science reaches a crisis, at which point a new paradigm, which subsumes the old results along with the anomalous results into one framework, is accepted. This is termed revolutionary science. The difference between normal and revolutionary science soon sparked the Kuhn–Popper debate.

In SSR, Kuhn also argues that rival paradigms are incommensurable—that is, it is not possible to understand one paradigm through the conceptual framework and terminology of another rival paradigm. For many critics, for example David Stove (Popper and After, 1982), this thesis seemed to entail that theory choice is fundamentally irrational: if rival theories cannot be directly compared, then one cannot make a rational choice as to which one is better. Whether Kuhn's views had such relativistic consequences is the subject of much debate; Kuhn himself denied the accusation of relativism in the third edition of SSR, and sought to clarify his views to avoid further misinterpretation. Freeman Dyson has quoted Kuhn as saying "I am not a Kuhnian!", referring to the relativism that some philosophers have developed based on his work.

The Structure of Scientific Revolutions is the single most widely cited book in the social sciences. The enormous impact of Kuhn's work can be measured in the changes it brought about in the vocabulary of the philosophy of science: besides "paradigm shift", Kuhn popularized the word paradigm itself from a term used in certain forms of linguistics and the work of Georg Lichtenberg to its current broader meaning, coined the term "normal science" to refer to the relatively routine, day-to-day work of scientists working within a paradigm, and was largely responsible for the use of the term "scientific revolutions" in the plural, taking place at widely different periods of time and in different disciplines, as opposed to a single Scientific Revolution in the late Renaissance. The frequent use of the phrase "paradigm shift" has made scientists more aware of and in many cases more receptive to paradigm changes, so that Kuhn's analysis of the evolution of scientific views has by itself influenced that evolution.

Kuhn's work has been extensively used in social science; for instance, in the post-positivist/positivist debate within International Relations. Kuhn is credited as a foundational force behind the post-Mertonian sociology of scientific knowledge. Kuhn's work has also been used in the Arts and Humanities, such as by Matthew Edward Harris to distinguish between scientific and historical communities (such as political or religious groups): 'political-religious beliefs and opinions are not epistemologically the same as those pertaining to scientific theories'. This is because would-be scientists' worldviews are changed through rigorous training, through the engagement between what Kuhn calls 'exemplars' and the Global Paradigm. Kuhn's notions of paradigms and paradigm shifts have been influential in understanding the history of economic thought, for example the Keynesian Revolution, and in debates in political science.

A defense Kuhn gives against the objection that his account of science from The Structure of Scientific Revolutions results in relativism can be found in an essay by Kuhn called "Objectivity, Value Judgment, and Theory Choice." In this essay, he reiterates five criteria from the penultimate chapter of SSR that determine (or help determine, more properly) theory choice:

1. Accurate – empirically adequate with experimentation and observation
2. Consistent – internally consistent, but also externally consistent with other theories
3. Broad Scope – a theory's consequences should extend beyond that which it was initially designed to explain
4. Simple – the simplest explanation, principally similar to Occam's razor
5. Fruitful – a theory should disclose new phenomena or new relationships among phenomena

He then goes on to show how, although these criteria admittedly determine theory choice, they are imprecise in practice and relative to individual scientists. According to Kuhn, "When scientists must choose between competing theories, two men fully committed to the same list of criteria for choice may nevertheless reach different conclusions." For this reason, the criteria still are not "objective" in the usual sense of the word because individual scientists reach different conclusions with the same criteria due to valuing one criterion over another or even adding additional criteria for selfish or other subjective reasons. Kuhn then goes on to say, "I am suggesting, of course, that the criteria of choice with which I began function not as rules, which determine choice, but as values, which influence it." Because Kuhn uses the history of science in his account of science, his criteria or values for theory choice are often understood as descriptive normative rules (or more properly, values) of theory choice for the scientific community rather than prescriptive normative rules in the usual sense of the word "criteria", although there are many varied interpretations of Kuhn's account of science.

=== Post-Structure philosophy ===
Years after the publication of The Structure of Scientific Revolutions, Kuhn dropped the concept of a paradigm and began to focus on the semantic aspects of scientific theories. In particular, Kuhn focuses on the taxonomic structure of scientific kind terms. In SSR he had dealt extensively with "meaning-changes". Later he spoke more of "terms of reference", providing each of them with a taxonomy. And even the changes that have to do with incommensurability were interpreted as taxonomic changes. As a consequence, a scientific revolution is not defined as a "change of paradigm" anymore, but rather as a change in the taxonomic structure of the theoretical language of science. Some scholars describe this change as resulting from a 'linguistic turn'. In their book, Andersen, Barker and Chen use some recent theories in cognitive psychology to vindicate Kuhn's mature philosophy.

Apart from dropping the concept of a paradigm, Kuhn also began to look at the process of scientific specialisation. In a scientific revolution, a new paradigm (or a new taxonomy) replaces the old one; by contrast, specialisation leads to a proliferation of new specialties and disciplines. This attention to the proliferation of specialties would make Kuhn's model less 'revolutionary' and more "evolutionary".

[R]evolutions, which produce new divisions between fields in scientific development, are much like episodes of speciation in biological evolution. The biological parallel to revolutionary change is not mutation, as I thought for many years, but speciation. And the problems presented by speciation (e.g., the difficulty in identifying an episode of speciation until some time after it has occurred, and the impossibility even then, of dating the time of its occurrence) are very similar to those presented by revolutionary change and by the emergence and individuation of new scientific specialties.

Some philosophers claim that Kuhn attempted to describe different kinds of scientific change: revolutions and specialty-creation. Others claim that the process of specialisation is in itself a special case of scientific revolutions. It is also possible to argue that, in Kuhn's model, science evolves through revolutions.

At the time of his death, Kuhn was working on a book entitled The Plurality of Worlds: An Evolutionary Theory of Scientific Development (PoW). This incomplete work, together with some of Kuhn's late writings, was edited and published in 2022. In the book, Kuhn outlines his “dynamic perspective on science”, a philosophical view developed in opposition to the so-called “static image” and intended to address its perceived shortcomings.

Kuhn also returns to the issue of meaning. He argues that, in order to “break into the past” and understand the history of science on its own terms—rather than as an immature or misguided version of present science—it is necessary to reconstruct and interpret the language of past scientific theories. Contrary to commentators who characterize Kuhn's mature work as resulting from a “linguistic” or “a priori” turn, a central part of PoW is devoted to issues of language and concept acquisition from the perspective of experimental and developmental psychology. A substantial portion of the book is therefore aimed at providing a naturalistic foundation for Kuhn's theory of meaning.

In light of the growing body of newly published material, including both pre- and post-Structure writings, some scholars have called for a “Structure-decentered” approach to understanding the philosophy of Thomas Kuhn.

=== Polanyi–Kuhn debate ===
Although they used different terminologies, both Kuhn and Michael Polanyi believed that scientists' subjective experiences made science a relativized discipline. Polanyi lectured on this topic for decades before Kuhn published The Structure of Scientific Revolutions.

Supporters of Polanyi charged Kuhn with plagiarism, as it was known that Kuhn attended several of Polanyi's lectures, and that the two men had debated endlessly over epistemology before either had achieved fame. After the charge of plagiarism, Kuhn acknowledged Polanyi in the Second edition of The Structure of Scientific Revolutions. Despite this intellectual alliance, Polanyi's work was constantly interpreted by others within the framework of Kuhn's paradigm shifts, much to Polanyi's (and Kuhn's) dismay.

== Personal life ==
Thomas Kuhn was married twice, first to Kathryn Muhs with whom he had three children, then to Jehane Barton Burns (Jehane B. Kuhn).

== Awards and honors ==
Kuhn was named a Guggenheim Fellow in 1954, elected to the American Academy of Arts and Sciences in 1963, elected to the American Philosophical Society in 1974, elected to the United States National Academy of Sciences in 1979, and, in 1982 was awarded the George Sarton Medal by the History of Science Society. In 1983 he received the John Desmond Bernal Award from the Society for Social Studies of Science and in 1990 he became a corresponding fellow of the British Academy. He also received numerous honorary doctorates.

In honor of his legacy, the Thomas Kuhn Paradigm Shift Award is awarded by the American Chemical Society to speakers who present original views that are at odds with mainstream scientific understanding. The winner is selected based on the novelty of the viewpoint and its potential impact if it were to be widely accepted.

== Bibliography ==
- Kuhn, T. S. The Copernican Revolution: Planetary Astronomy in the Development of Western Thought. Cambridge: Harvard University Press, 1957. ISBN 0-674-17100-4
- Kuhn, T. S. The Function of Measurement in Modern Physical Science. Isis, 52 (1961): 161–193.
- Kuhn, T. S. The Structure of Scientific Revolutions. Chicago: University of Chicago Press, 1962. ISBN 0-226-45808-3
- Kuhn, T. S. "The Function of Dogma in Scientific Research". pp. 347–369 in A. C. Crombie (ed.). Scientific Change (Symposium on the History of Science, University of Oxford, July 9–15, 1961). New York and London: Basic Books and Heineman, 1963.
- Kuhn, T. S. The Essential Tension: Selected Studies in Scientific Tradition and Change. Chicago and London: University of Chicago Press, 1977. ISBN 0-226-45805-9
- Kuhn, T. S. Black-Body Theory and the Quantum Discontinuity, 1894-1912. Chicago: University of Chicago Press, 1987. ISBN 0-226-45800-8
- Kuhn, T. S. The Road Since Structure: Philosophical Essays, 1970–1993. Chicago: University of Chicago Press, 2000. ISBN 0-226-45798-2
- Kuhn, T. S. The Last Writings of Thomas S. Kuhn. Chicago: University of Chicago Press, 2022.
