= Timeline of Solar System astronomy =

The following is a timeline of Solar System astronomy and science. It includes the advances in the knowledge of the Earth at planetary scale, as part of it.

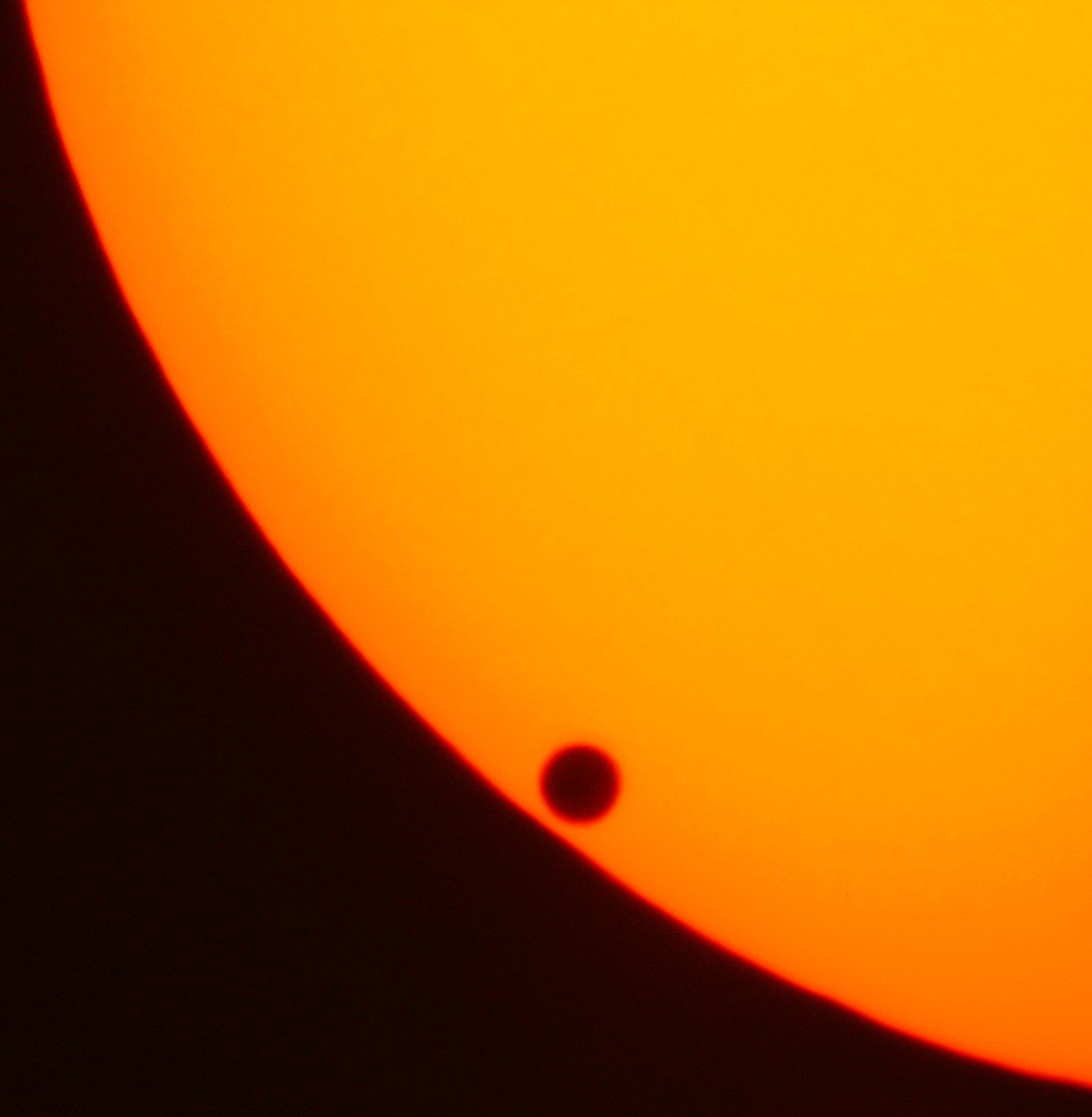
A transit of Venus

== Direct observation ==
Humans (Homo sapiens) have inhabited the Earth in the last 300,000 years at least, and they had witnessed directly observable astronomical and geological phenomena. For millennia, these have aroused admiration and curiosity, being recognized as of superhuman nature and scale. Multiple imaginative interpretations were being fixed in oral traditions of difficult dating, and incorporated into a variety of belief systems, as animism, shamanism, mythology, religion and/or philosophy.

Although such phenomena are not "discoveries" per se, as they are part of the common human experience, their observation shape the knowledge and comprehension of the world around us, and about its position in the observable universe, in which the Sun plays a role of outmost importance for us. What today is known to be the Solar System was regarded for generations as the contents of the "whole universe".

The most relevant phenomena of these kind are:

- Basic gravity. Following the trajectory of free falling objects, the Earth is "below" us and the sky is "above" us.
- Characterization of the terrestrial surface, in four main types of terrain: lands covered with vegetation; dry deserts; bodies of liquid water, both salted (seas and oceans) and fresh (rivers and lakes); and frozen landscapes (glaciars, polar ice caps). Recognition of emerged lands and submerged ones. Recognition of mountain ranges and cavities (grottos and caverns).
- Characterization of the Earth's atmosphere and its associated meteorological phenomena: clouds, rain, hail and snow; wind, storms and thunderstorms, tornadoes and hurricanes/cyclones/typhoons; fluvial floods, deluges, landslides and avalanches; rainbows and halos; mirages; glacial ages.
- Diurnal apparent movement of the Sun: sunrise, noon and sunset. Recognition of the four cardinal points: north, south, east, and west.
- Nightly apparent movement of the celestial sphere with its main features regarded as "fixed": stars, the brightest of them forming casual groupings known as constellations, under different names and shapes in many cultures. Different constellations are viewed in different seasons and latitudes. Along with the faint strip of the Milky Way, they altogether conform the idea of the firmament, which as viewed from Earth it seems to be a consistent, solid unit rotating smooth and uniformly. This leads to the intuitive idea of a geocentric universe.
- Presence of the Moon, with its phases. Tides. Recognition of meteorological phenomena as sub-lunar.
- Yearly apparent transit of the Sun through the constellations of the zodiac. Recognition of the lunar cycle as a (lunar) month, and the solar cycle as the (solar) year, the basis for calendars.
- Observation of non-fixed or "wandering" objects in the night sky: the five classical planets; shooting stars and meteor showers; bolides; comets; auroras; zodiacal light.
- Solar and lunar eclipses. Planetary conjunctions.
- Identification of the frigid, temperate and torrid zones of the Earth by latitude. Equator and Tropics. Four seasons in temperate zones: spring, summer, autumn and winter. Equinoxes and solstices. Monsoons. Midnight sun.
- Telluric phenomena: seismic (earthquakes and seaquakes; tsunamis). Geysers. Volcanoes.

Along with an indeterminate number of unregistered sightings of rare events: meteor impacts; novae and supernovae.

== Antiquity ==
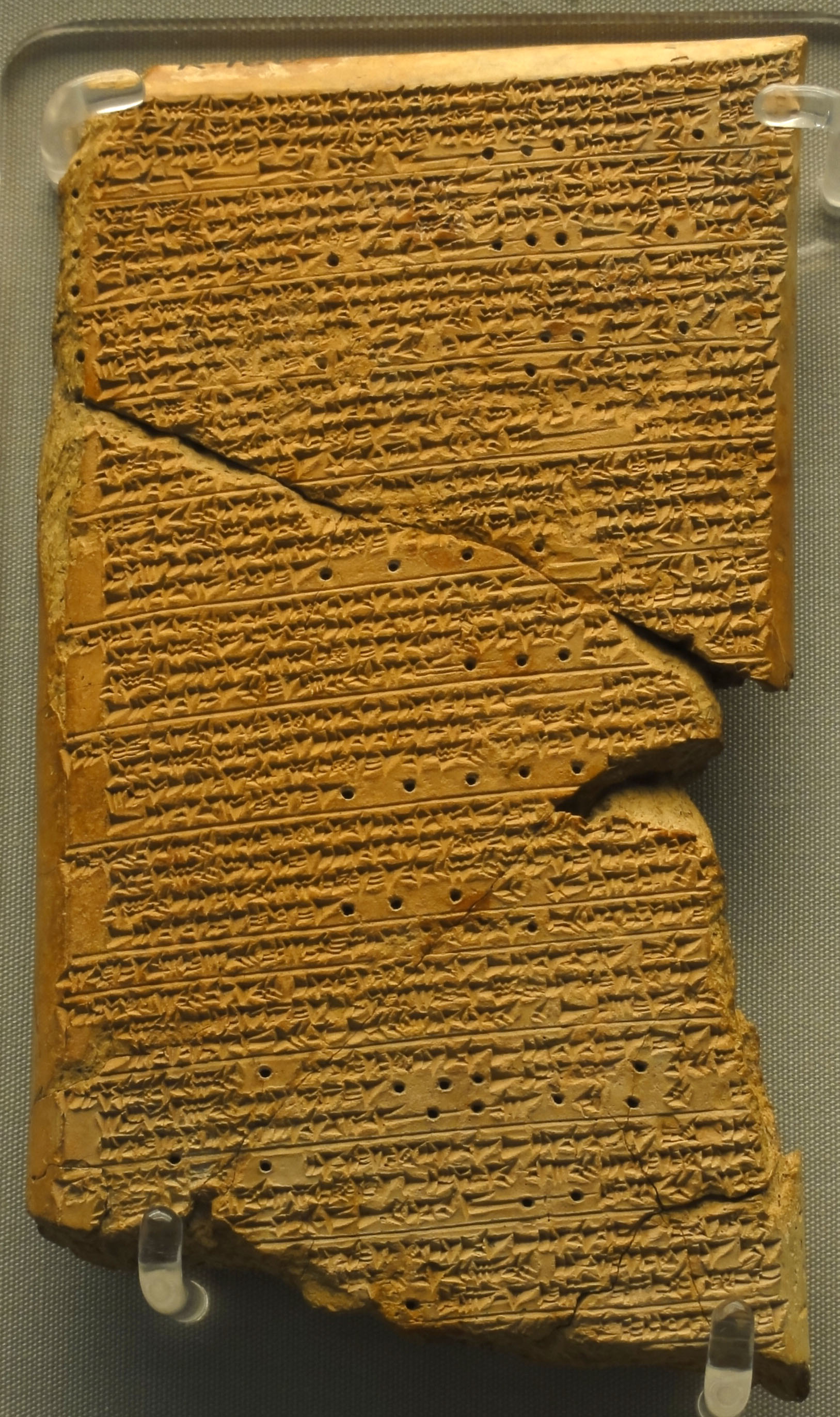
Venus tablet of Ammisaduqa

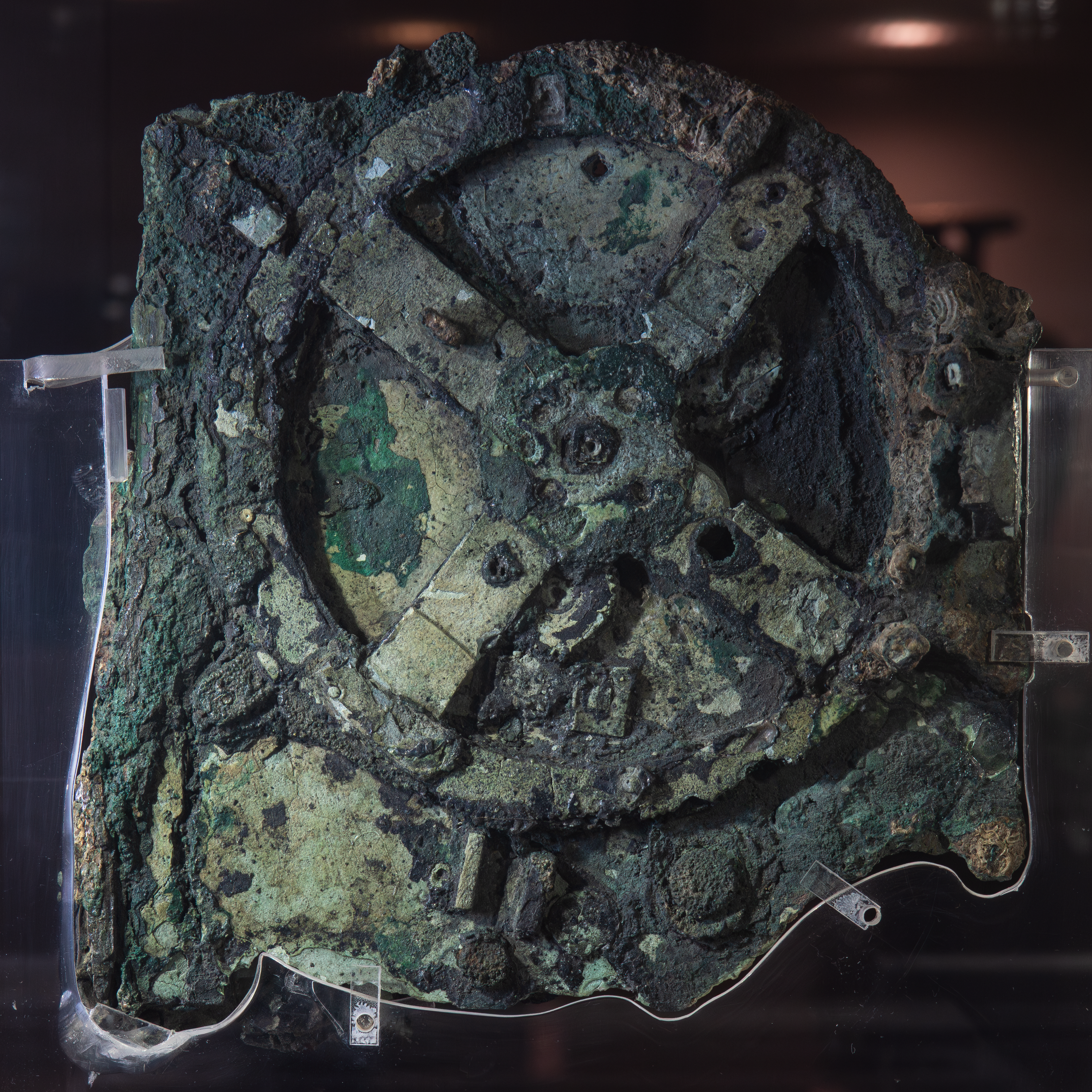
The Antikythera mechanism (Fragment A – front); visible is the largest gear in the mechanism, approximately 140 millimetres (5.5 in) in diameter

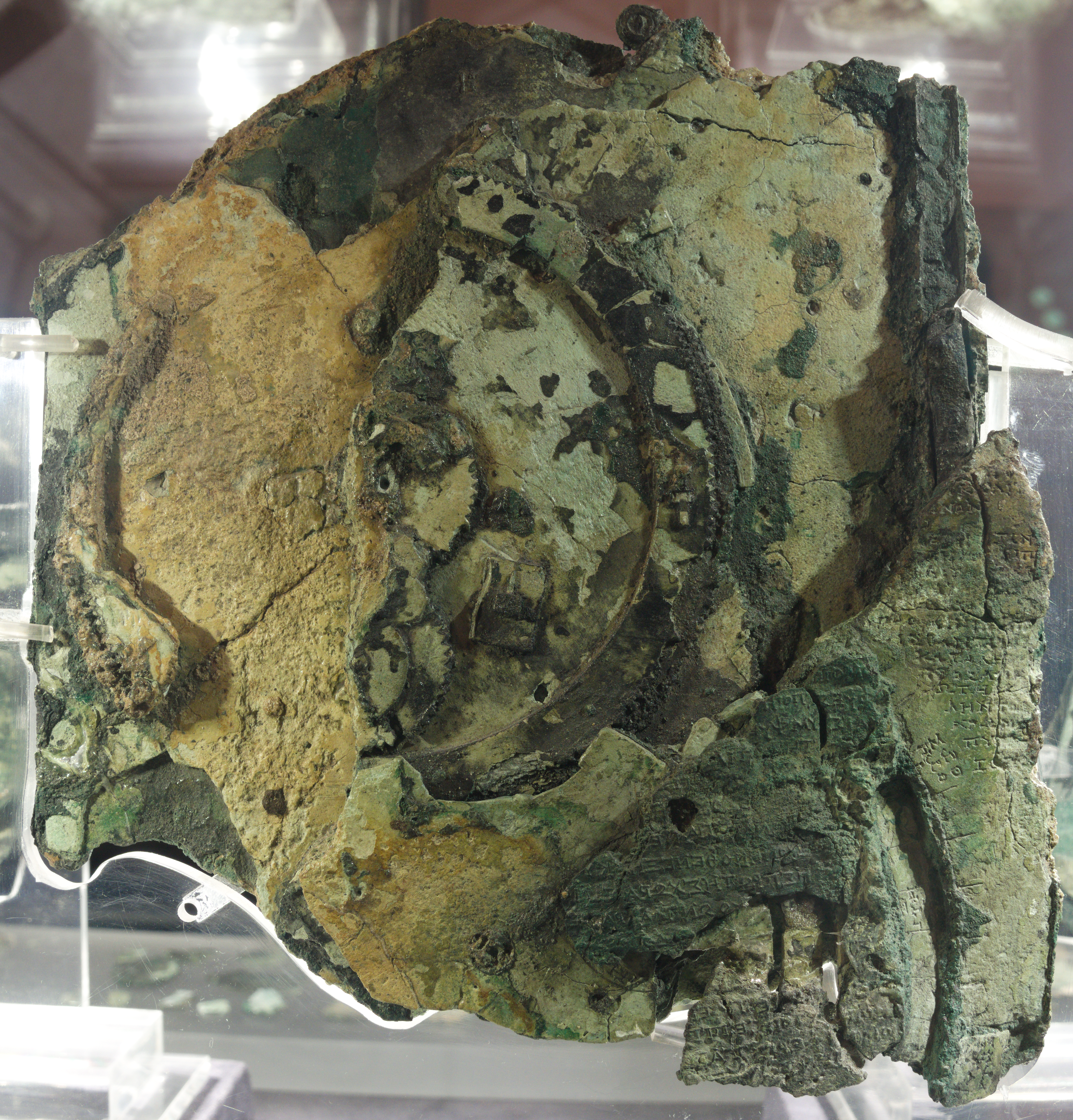
The Antikythera mechanism (Fragment A – back)

- 2nd millennium BCE – Earliest possible date for the composition of the Babylonian Venus tablet of Ammisaduqa, a 7th-century BC copy of a list of observations of the motions of the planet Venus, and the oldest planetary table currently known.
- 2nd millennium BCE – Babylonian astronomers identify the inner planets Mercury and Venus and the outer planets Mars, Jupiter and Saturn, which would remain the only known planets until the invention of the telescope in early modern times.
- Late 2nd millennium BCE – Chinese astronomers record a solar eclipse during the reign of Zhong Kang, described as part of the document Punitive Expedition of Yin in the Book of Documents.
- Late 2nd millennium BCE – Chinese established their timing cycle of 12 Earthly Branches based on the approximate number of years (11.86) it takes Jupiter to complete a single revolution in the sky.
- c. 1200 BCE – Earliest Babylonian star catalogues.
- c. 1100 BCE – Chinese first determine the spring equinox.
- c. 750 BCE – During the reign of Nabonassar (747–733 BC), the systematic records of ominous phenomena in Babylonian astronomical diaries that began at this time allowed for the discovery of a repeating 18-year cycle of lunar eclipses.
- 776 BCE – Chinese make the earliest reliable record of a solar eclipse.
- 687 BCE – Chinese make earliest known record of meteor shower.
- 7th century BCE – Egyptian astronomers alleged to have predicted a solar eclipse.
- 613 BCE – A comet, possibly Comet Halley, is recorded in Spring and Autumn Annals by the Chinese.
- 586 BCE – Thales of Miletus alleged to have predicted a solar eclipse.
- c. 560 BCE – Anaximander posits a mechanical model of the world: a cylindrical Earth floats freely in space surrounded by three concentric wheels turning at different distances: the closest for the stars and planets, the second for the Moon and the farthest for the Sun, all conceived not as bodies but as "fire seen thru holes" in every wheel. But he starts to feed the idea of celestial mechanics as different of the notion of planets being heavenly deities, leaving mythology aside.
- c. 475 BCE – Parmenides is credited to be the first Greek who declared that the Earth is spherical and is situated in the centre of the universe, believed to have been the first to detect the identity of Hesperus, the evening-star, and Phosphorus, the morning-star (Venus), and by some, the first to claim that moonlight is a reflection of sunlight.
- c. 450 BCE – Anaxagoras shows that the Moon shines by reflected sunlight: the phases of the Moon are caused by the illumination of its sphere by the Sun in different angles along the lunar month. He was also the first to give a correct explanation of eclipses, by asserting that the Moon is rocky, thus opaque, and closer to the Earth than the Sun.
- c. 400 BCE – Philolaus and other Pythagoreans propose a model in which the Earth and the Sun revolve around an invisible "Central Fire" (not the Sun), and the Moon and the planets orbit the Earth. Due to philosophical concerns about the number 10, they also added a tenth "hidden body" or Counter-Earth (Antichthon), always in the opposite side of the invisible Central Fire and therefore also invisible from Earth.
- c. 360 BCE – Plato claims in his Timaeus that circles and spheres are the preferred shape of the universe and that the Earth is at the centre. These circles are the orbits of the heavenly bodies, varying in size for every of them. He arranged these celestial orbs, in increasing order from the Earth: Moon, Sun, Venus, Mercury, Mars, Jupiter, Saturn, and the fixed stars located on the celestial sphere forming the outermost shell.
- c. 360 BCE – Eudoxus of Cnidus proposes for first time a purely geometric-mathematical, geocentric model of the planetary movements, including that of the Sun and the Moon.
- c. 350 BCE – Aristotle argues for a spherical Earth using lunar eclipses and other observations. Also, he asserts his conception of the heavenly spheres, and of an outer space fulfilled with aether.
- c. 330 BCE – Heraclides Ponticus is said to be the first Greek who proposes that the Earth rotates on its axis, from west to east, once every 24 hours, contradicting Aristotle's teachings. Simplicius says that Heraclides proposed that the irregular movements of the planets can be explained if the Earth moves while the Sun stays still, but these statements are disputed.
- c. 280 BCE – Aristarchus of Samos offers the first definite discussion of the possibility of a heliocentric cosmos, and uses the size of the Earth's shadow on the Moon to estimate the Moon's orbital radius at 60 Earth radii, and its physical radius as one-third that of the Earth. He also makes an inaccurate attempt to measure the distance to the Sun.
- c. 250 BCE – Following the heliocentric ideas of Aristarcus, Archimedes in his work The Sand Reckoner computes the diameter of the universe centered around the Sun to be about 10^{14} stadia (in modern units, about 2 light years, 18.93×10^{12} km, 11.76×10^{12} mi).
- c. 210 BCE – Apollonius of Perga shows the equivalence of two descriptions of the apparent retrograde planet motions (assuming the geocentric model), one using eccentrics and another deferent and epicycles.
- c. 200 BCE – Eratosthenes determines that the radius of the Earth is roughly 6,400 km (4,000 mi).
- c. 150 BCE – According to Strabo (1.1.9), Seleucus of Seleucia is the first to state that the tides are due to the attraction of the Moon, and that the height of the tides depends on the Moon's position relative to the Sun.
- c. 150 BCE – Hipparchus uses parallax to determine that the distance to the Moon is roughly 380,000 km (236,100 mi).
- c. 134 BCE – Hipparchus discovers the precession of the equinoxes.
- c. 87 BCE – The Antikythera mechanism, the earliest known computer, is built. It is an extremely complex astronomical computer designed to predict solar and lunar eclipses accurately and track the movements of the planets and the Sun. It could also calculate the differences in the apsidial and axial precession of heavenly bodies with extreme degree of accuracy.
- 28 BCE – Chinese history book Book of Han makes earliest known dated record of sunspot.
- c. 150 CE – Claudius Ptolemy completes his work Almagest, that codifies the astronomical knowledge of his time and cements the geocentric model in the West, and it remained the most authoritative text on astronomy for more than 1,500 years. The Almagest put forward extremely complex and accurate methods to determine the position and structure of planets, stars (including some objects as nebulae, supernovas and galaxies then regarded as stars also) and heavenly bodies. It includes a catalogue of 1,022 stars (largely based on a previous one by Hipparchus of about 850 entries) and a large amount of constellations, comets and other astronomical phenomena. Following a long astrological tradition, he arranged the heavenly spheres ordering them (from Earth outward): Moon, Mercury, Venus, Sun, Mars, Jupiter, Saturn and fixed stars.
- c. 420 – Martianus Capella describes a modified geocentric model, in which the Earth is at rest in the center of the universe and circled by the Moon, the Sun, three planets and the stars, while Mercury and Venus circle the Sun.

== Middle Ages ==
- c. 500 – Indian mathematician-astronomer Aryabhata accurately computes the solar and lunar eclipses, and the length of Earth's revolution around the Sun.
- c. 500 – Aryabhata discovers the oblique motion of the apsidial precession of the Sun and notes that it is changing with respect to the motion of stars and Earth.
- c. 500 – Aryabhata discovers the rotation of the Earth by conducting experiments and giving empirical examples for his theories. He also explains the cause of day and night through the diurnal rotation of the Earth. He also developed highly accurate models for the orbital motion of the Moon, Mercury and Mars. He also developed a geocentric model of the universe.
- c. 620 – Indian mathematician-astronomer Brahmagupta describe gravity as a attractive force by the term guruvatkarshan.
- 628 – Brahmagupta gives methods for calculations of the motions and places of various planets, their rising and setting, conjunctions, and calculations of the solar and lunar eclipses.
- 820 – Persian astronomer, Muhammad ibn Musa al-Khwarizmi, composes his Zij astronomical tables, utilising Arabic numerals and the Hindu–Arabic numeral system in his calculations. He also translates Aryabhata's astronomical and mathematical treatises into Arabic.
- 850 – Al-Farghani (Alfraganus) translated and wrote commentary on Ptolemy's Almagest and gave values for the motion of the ecliptic, and the precessional movement of the heavenly bodies based on the values given by Ptolemy and Hipparchus.
- 1019 – Al-Biruni observes and describes the lunar eclipse on September 17 in detail and gives the exact latitudes of the stars during it.
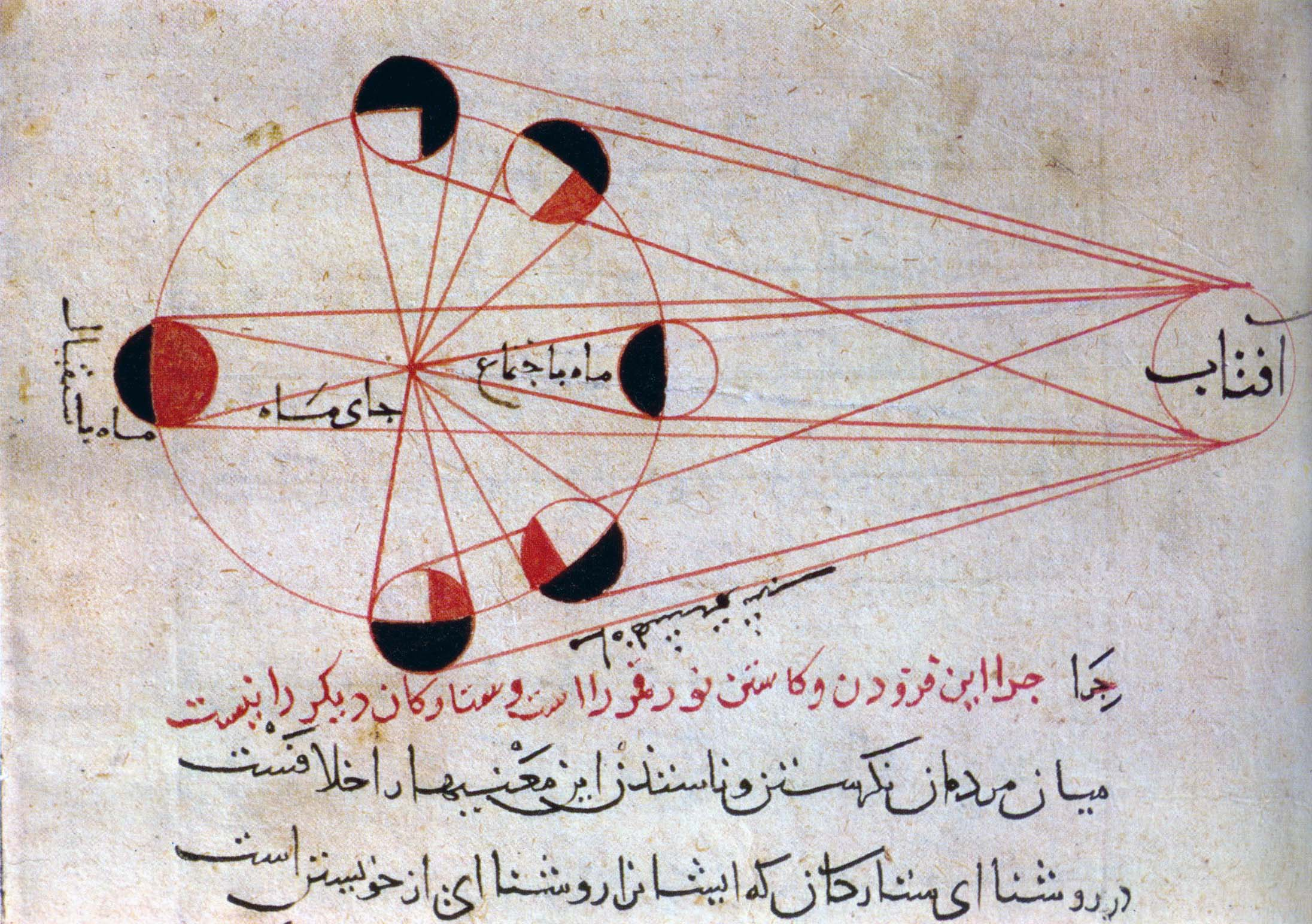
  An annotated diagram explaining the phases of the moon from one of al-Biruni's astronomical works. Sun (far right) – Earth (far left) and Lunar phases
- c. 1030 – In his major astronomical work, the Mas'ud Canon, Al-Biruni observed that, contrary to Ptolemy, the Sun's apogee (highest point in the heavens) was mobile, not fixed.
- c. 1060 – Andalusi astronomer Al-Zarqali corrects geographical data from Ptolemy and Al-Khwarizmi, specifically by correcting Ptolemy's estimate of the longitude of the Mediterranean Sea from 62 degrees to the correct value of 42 degrees. He was the first to demonstrate the motion of the solar apogee relative to the fixed background of the stars, measuring its rate of motion as 12.9 seconds per year, which is remarkably close to the modern calculation of 11.77 seconds. Al-Zarqālī also contributed to the famous Tables of Toledo.
- c. 1175 – Gerard of Cremona translates Ptolemy's Almagest from Arabic into Latin.
- 1178 – Five witnesses from Canterbury reported to the abbey's chronicler, Gervase, that shortly after sunset on 18 June, they saw "the upper horn [of the moon] split in two". The unusual phenomenon is compatible with the sighting of the impact of a disrupted comet close the Moon's edge (as viewed from Earth) in an area occupied by the crater now known as Giordano Bruno, as some claimed in the 1970s, but there is still no conclusive evidence. If confirmed, it would be the first recorded event of this kind.
- c. 1200 – Fakhr al-Din al-Razi, in dealing with his conception of physics and the physical world, rejected the Aristotelian and Avicennian view of a single world, but instead proposed that there are "a thousand thousand worlds (alfa alfi 'awalim) beyond this world such that each one of those worlds be bigger and more massive than this world as well as having the like of what this world has."

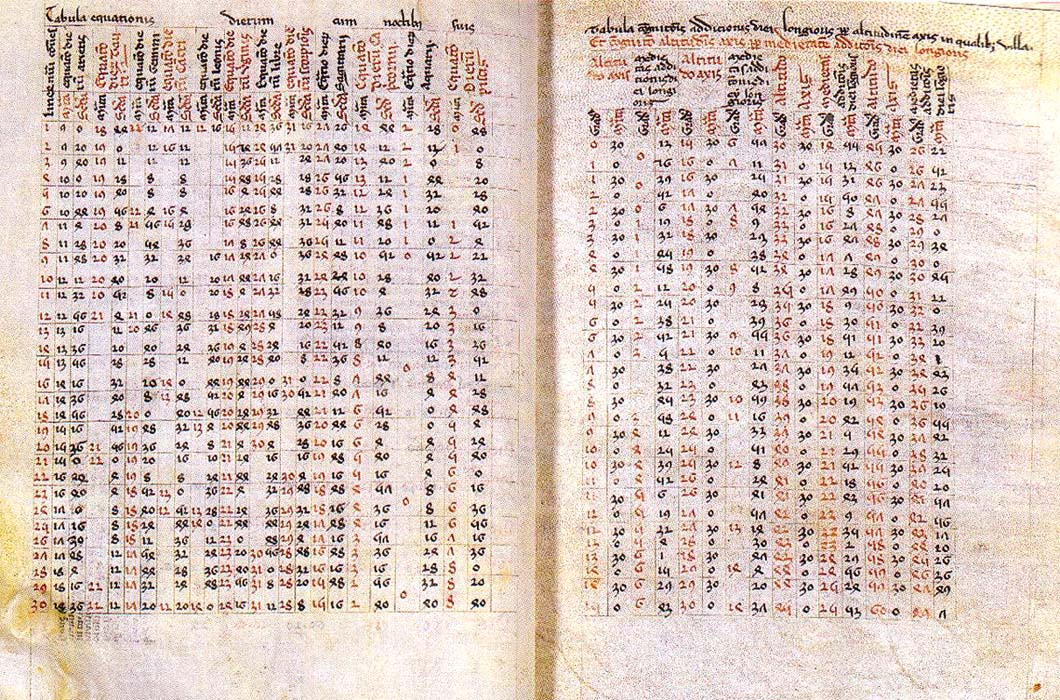
Alfonsine Tables

- 1252 – Alfonso X of Castile sponsored the creation and compilation of the Alfonsine Tables by scholars he assemble in the Toledo School of Translators in Toledo, Spain. These astronomical tables were used and updated during the following three centuries, as the main source of astronomical data, mainly to calculate ephemerides (which were in turn used by astrologers to cast horoscopes).
- c. 1300 – Jewish astronomer Levi ben Gershon (Gersonides) recognized that the stars are much larger than the planets. Gersonides appears to be among the few astronomers before modern times, along Aristarcus, to have surmised that the fixed stars are much further away than the planets. While all other astronomers put the fixed stars on a rotating sphere just beyond the outer planets, Gersonides estimated the distance to the fixed stars to be no less than 159,651,513,380,944 Earth radii, or about 100,000 light-years in modern units.
- c. 1350 – Ibn al-Shatir anticipates Copernicus by abandoning the equant of Ptolemy in his calculations of planetary motion, and he provides a proto empirical model of lunar motion which accurately matches observations.
- c. 1350 – Nicole Oresme put forward several revolutionary theories like mean speed theorem, which he used in calculating the position and shape of the planetary orbits, measuring the apsidial and axial precession of the lunar and solar orbits, measuring the angles and distance between ecliptics and calculating stellar and planetary distances. In his Livre du Ciel et du Monde, Oresme discussed a range of evidence for the daily rotation of the Earth on its axis.
- 1440 – Nicholas of Cusa proposes that the Earth rotates on its axis in his book, On Learned Ignorance. Like Oresme, he also wrote about the possibility of the plurality of worlds.

== 16th century ==
- 1501 – Indian astronomer Nilakantha Somayaji proposes a universe in which the planets orbit the Sun, but the Sun orbits the Earth.
- c. 1514 – Nicolaus Copernicus states his heliocentric theory in Commentariolus.
- 1522 – First circumnavigation of the world by Magellan-Elcano expedition shows that the Earth is, in effect, a sphere.
- 1543 – Copernicus publishes his heliocentric theory in De revolutionibus orbium coelestium.
- 1576 – Tycho Brahe founds the first modern astronomical observatory in modern Europe, Uraniborg.
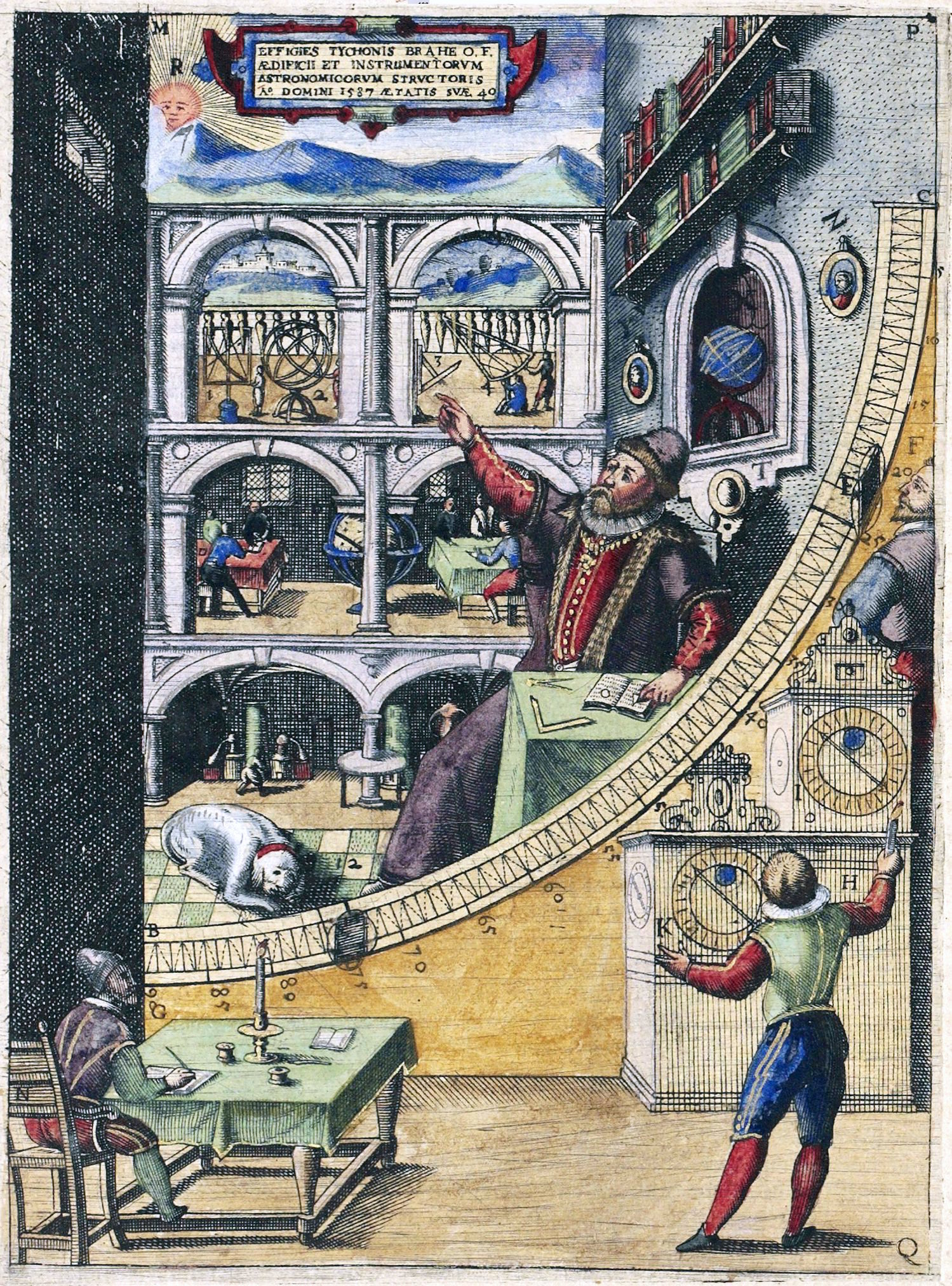
  Engraving of the mural quadrant from Brahe's book Astronomiae instauratae mechanica (1598)
- 1577 – Tycho Brahe records the position of the Great Comet of that year as viewed from Uraniborg (in the island Hven, near Copenhagen) and compares it with that observed by Thadaeus Hagecius from Prague at the same time, giving deliberate consideration to the movement of the Moon. It was discovered that, while the comet was in approximately the same place for both of them, the Moon was not, and this meant that the comet was much further out, contrary to what was previously conceived as an atmospheric phenomenon.
- 1582 – Pope Gregory XIII introduces the Gregorian calendar, an enhanced solar calendar more accurate than the previous Roman Julian calendar. The principal change was to space leap years differently so as to make the average calendar year 365.2425 days long, more closely approximating the 365.2422-day 'tropical' or 'solar' year that is determined by the Earth's revolution around the Sun. The reform advanced the date by 10 days: Thursday 4 October 1582 was followed by Friday 15 October 1582. The Gregorian calendar is still in use today.
- 1584 – Giordano Bruno published two important philosophical dialogues (La Cena de le Ceneri and De l'infinito universo et mondi) in which he argued against the planetary spheres and affirmed the Copernican principle. Bruno's infinite universe was filled with a substance – a "pure air", aether, or spiritus – that offered no resistance to the heavenly bodies which, in Bruno's view, rather than being fixed, moved under their own impetus (momentum). Most dramatically, he completely abandoned the idea of a hierarchical universe. Bruno's cosmology distinguishes between "suns" which produce their own light and heat, and have other bodies moving around them; and "earths" which move around suns and receive light and heat from them. Bruno suggested that some, if not all, of the objects classically known as fixed stars are in fact suns, so he was arguably the first person to grasp that "stars are other suns with their own planets." Bruno wrote that other worlds "have no less virtue nor a nature different from that of our Earth" and, like Earth, "contain animals and inhabitants".
- 1588 – Tycho Brahe publishes his own Tychonic system, a blend between Ptolemy's classical geocentric model and Copernicus' heliocentric model, in which the Sun and the Moon revolve around the Earth, in the center of universe, and all other planets revolve around the Sun.

== 17th century ==
- 1600 – William Gilbert with his model called the terrella, shows the Earth behaves like a huge but low intensity magnet with its own magnetic field, which explains the behaviour of the compass pointing to the magnetic poles.
- 1604 – Galileo Galilei correctly hypothesized that the distance of a falling object is proportional to the square of the time elapsed.
- 1609 – Johannes Kepler states his first two empirical laws of planetary motion, stating that the orbits of the planets around the Sun are elliptical rather than circular, and thus resolving many ancient problems with planetary models, without the need of any epicycle.
- 1609 – Galileo Galilei starts to make telescopes with about 3x up to 30x magnification, based only on descriptions of the first practical telescope which Hans Lippershey tried to patent in the Netherlands in 1608. With a Galilean telescope, the observer could see magnified, upright images on the Earth – what is commonly known as a spyglass – but also it can be used to observe the sky, a key tool for further astronomical discoveries.
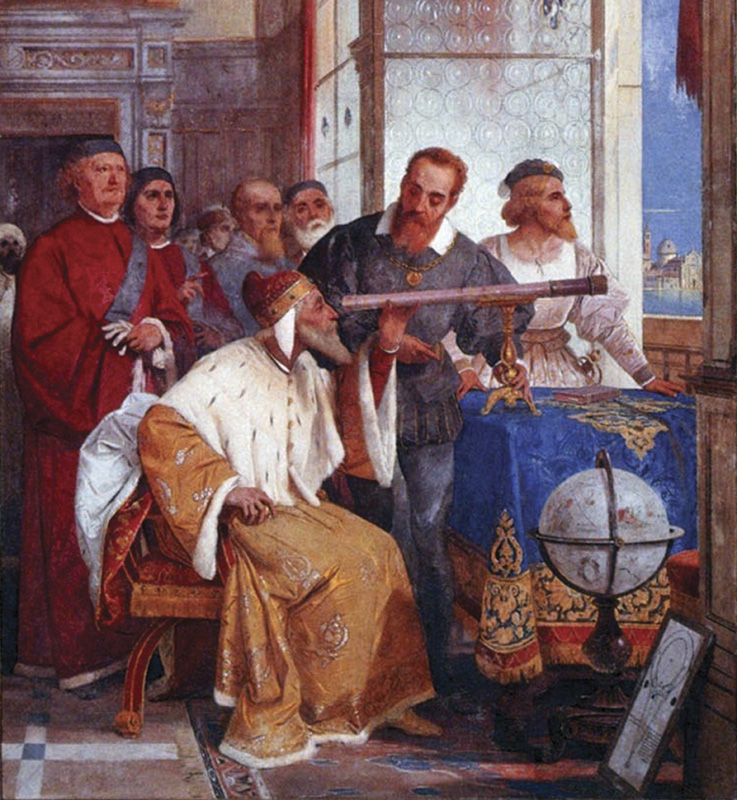
  Galileo showing the Doge of Venice how to use the telescope (fresco by Giuseppe Bertini)
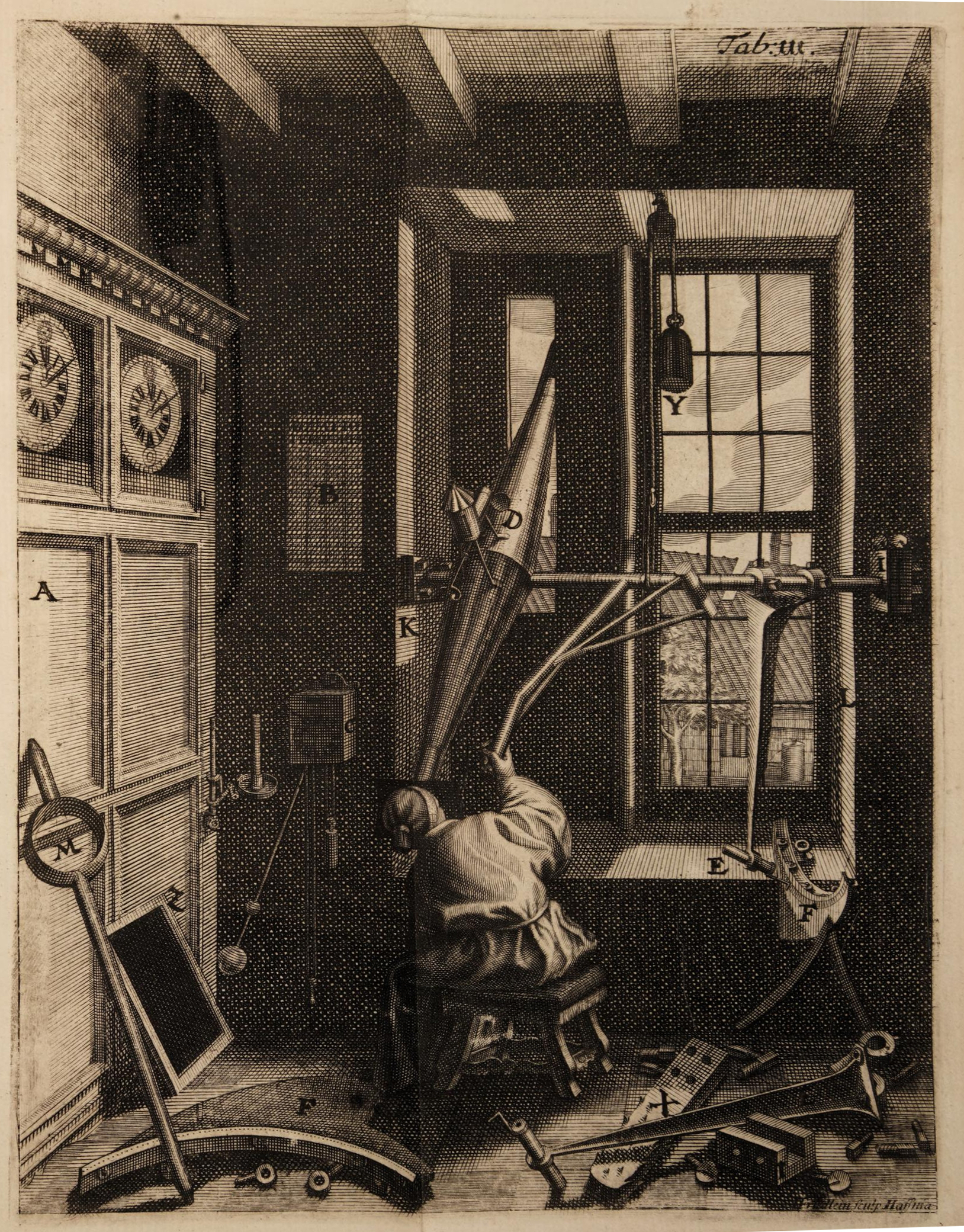
  Ole Rømer at work
- 1609 – Galileo Galilei aimed his telescope at the Moon. While not being the first person to observe the Moon through a telescope (English mathematician Thomas Harriot had done it four months before but only saw a "strange spottednesse"), Galileo was the first to deduce the cause of the uneven waning as light occlusion from lunar mountains and craters. He also estimated the heights of that mountains. The Moon was not what was long thought to have been a translucent and perfect sphere, as Aristotle claimed, and hardly the first "planet".
- 1610 – Galileo Galilei observes the four main moons of Jupiter: Callisto, Europa, Ganymede, and Io; sees Saturn's planetary rings (but does not recognize that they are rings), and observes the phases of Venus, disproving the Ptolemaic system though not the geocentric model.
- 1619 – Johannes Kepler states his third empirical law of planetary motion, which relates the distance and period of the planetary orbits.
- 1631 – Pierre Gassendi is the first to observe the transit of Mercury. He was surprised by the small size of the planet compared to the Sun.
- 1632 – Galileo Galilei is sometimes credited with the discovery of the lunar libration in latitude, although Thomas Harriot or William Gilbert might have done so before.
- 1639 – Jeremiah Horrocks and his friend and correspondent William Crabtree are the first astronomers known to observe and record a transit of Venus.
- 1643 – Evangelista Torricelli, disciple of Galileo, builds an elementary barometer, which shows that the air weighs, and incidentally creating the first artificial vacuum in a laboratory.
- 1648 – Johannes Hevelius discovers the lunar libration in longitude. It can reach 7°54′ in amplitude.
- 1648 – Blaise Pascal, aided by his brother-in-law Florin Périer at mount Puy de Dôme, shows that air pressure on a high mountain is less than at a lower altitude, proving his idea that, as air has a finite weight, Earth's atmosphere must have a maximum height.
- 1655 – Giovanni Domenico Cassini and Robert Hooke separately discover Jupiter's Great Red Spot.
- 1656 – Christiaan Huygens identifies Saturn's rings as rings and discovers its moon Titan.
- 1659 – Huygens estimated a value of about 24,000 Earth radii for the distance Earth-Sun, remarkably close to modern values but he was based on many unproven (and incorrect) assumptions; the accuracy of his value seems to be based more on luck than good measurement, with his various errors cancelling each other out.
- 1665 – Cassini determines the rotational speeds of Jupiter, Mars, and Venus.
- 1668 – Isaac Newton builds his own reflecting telescope, the first fully functional of this kind, and a landmark for future developings as it reduces spherical aberration with no chromatic aberration.
- 1672 – Cassini discovers Saturn's moons Iapetus and Rhea.
- 1672 – Jean Richer and Cassini measure the Earth-Sun distance, the astronomical unit, to be about 138,370,000 km.
- 1675 – Ole Rømer uses the orbital mechanics of Jupiter's moons to estimate that the speed of light is about 227,000 km/s.
- 1675 – Cassini discovers the main division in the rings of Saturn, named after him, the Cassini Division.
- 1686 – Cassini discovers Saturn's moons Tethys and Dione.
- 1687 – Isaac Newton publishes his law of universal gravitation in his work Philosophiæ Naturalis Principia Mathematica.
- 1690 – Cassini observes differential rotation within Jupiter's atmosphere.

== 18th century ==
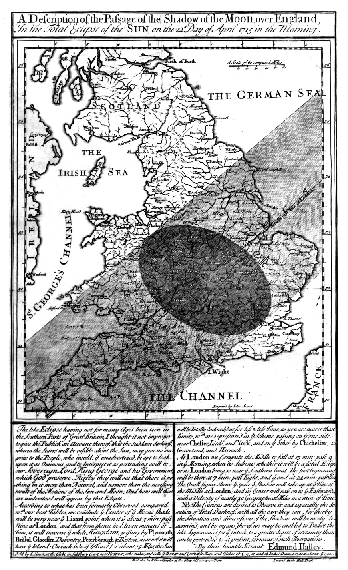
Halley's map of the path of the Solar eclipse of 3 May 1715 across England

- 1704 – John Locke enters the term "Solar System" in the English language, when he used it to refer to the Sun, planets, and comets as a whole.
- 1705 – Edmond Halley publicly predicts the periodicity of the comet of 1682 and computes its expected path of return in 1757.
- 1715 – Edmond Halley calculates the shadow path of a solar eclipse.
- 1716 – Edmond Halley suggests a high-precision measurement of the Sun-Earth distance by timing the transit of Venus.
- 1718 – Edmond Halley discovers proper motion of stars, dispelling the concept of the "fixed stars".
- 1729 – James Bradley determines the cause of the aberration of starlight, providing the first direct evidence of the Earth's motion, and a more accurate method to compute the speed of light.
- 1735–1739 – The French Academy of Sciences sends two expeditions to measure the oblateness of the Earth by measuring the length of a degree of latitude at two locations: one to Lapland, close to the Arctic Circle and other to the Equator, the French Geodesic Mission. Their measurements show that the Earth is an oblate spheroid flattened at the poles.
- 1749 – Pierre Bouguer, part of French Geodesic Mission, publish that he and Charles Marie de La Condamine had been able to detect a deflection of a pendulum's plumb-bob of 8 seconds of arc in the proximity of the volcano Chimborazo. Although not enough to measure the value of the gravitational constant accurately, the experiment had at least proved that the Earth could not be a hollow shell, as some thinkers of the day had suggested.
- c. 1750 – The three collinear Lagrange points (L1, L2, L3) were discovered by Leonhard Euler, a decade before Joseph-Louis Lagrange discovered the remaining two.
- 1752 – Benjamin Franklin conducts his kite experiment, successfully extracting sparks from a cloud, showing that lightning bolts are huge natural electrical discharges.
- 1755 – Immanuel Kant first formulates the nebular hypothesis of Solar System formation.
- 1758 – Johann Palitzsch observes the return of the comet that Edmond Halley had anticipated in 1705. The gravitational attraction of Jupiter had slowed the return by 618 days. Parisian astronomer La Caille suggests it should be named "Halley's Comet".
- 1761 – Parallax measurements of the transit of Venus allow astronomers to determine the absolute distances and sizes of the Sun and planets for the first time.
- 1761 – Mikhail Lomonosov is the first to discover and appreciate the atmosphere of Venus during his observation of the transit of Venus.
- 1766 – Johann Titius finds the Titius-Bode rule for planetary distances.
- 1772 – Johann Bode publishes the Titius-Bode rule for planetary distances.
- 1772–1775 – The second voyage of James Cook definitively disproves the existence of the hypothesized Southern continent of Terra Australis.
- 1775 – Charles Hutton, based on his analysis of the Schiehallion experiment, shows the Earth has a density of at least 4,500 kg·m^{−3} and suggests that it has a planetary core made of metal. (In comparison with the modern accepted figure of 5,515 kg·m^{−3}, the density of the Earth had been computed with an error of less than 20%.)
- 1781 – William Herschel discovers a seventh planet, Uranus, during a telescopic survey of the Northern sky.
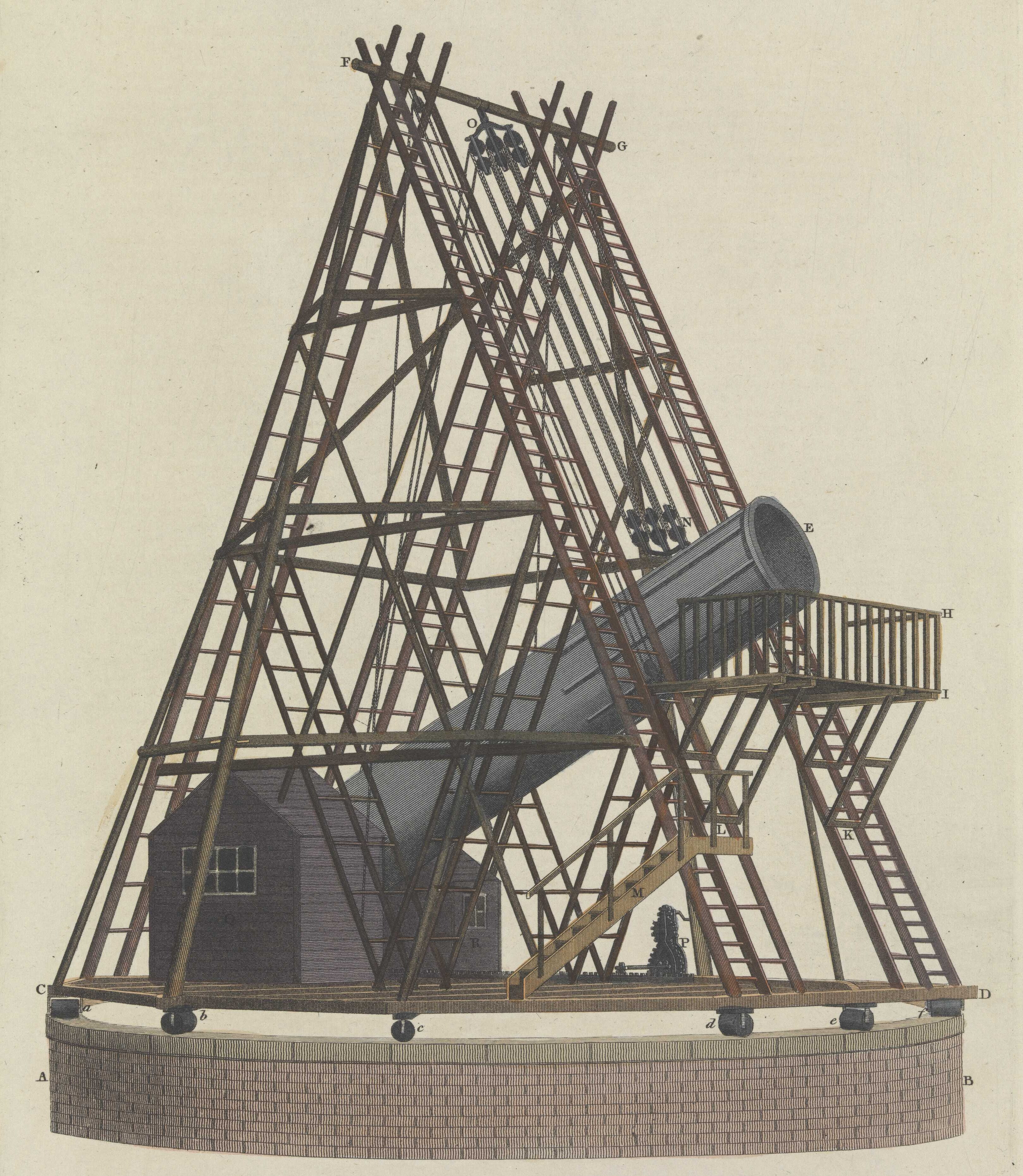
  The William Herschel's 40-foot (12 m) telescope
- 1781 – Charles Messier and his assistant Pierre Méchain publish the first catalogue of 110 nebulae and star clusters, the most prominent deep-sky objects that can easily be observed from Earth's Northern Hemisphere, in order not to be confused with ordinary Solar System's comets.
- 1783 – William Herschel discovers that Mars's polar cap expands and recedes with its year, showing that it has seasons.
- 1787 – Herschel discovers Uranus's moons Titania and Oberon.
- 1789 – Herschel discovers Saturn's moons Enceladus and Mimas.
- 1796 – Pierre Laplace re-states the nebular hypothesis for the formation of the Solar System from a spinning nebula of gas and dust.
- 1798 – Henry Cavendish accurately measures the gravitational constant in the laboratory, which allows the mass of the Earth to be derived, and hence the masses of all bodies in the Solar System.

== 19th century ==
- 1801 – Giuseppe Piazzi discovers Ceres, a body that filled a gap between Mars and Jupiter following the Titius-Bode rule. At first, it was regarded as a new planet.
- 1802 – Heinrich Wilhelm Olbers discovers Pallas, at roughly the same distance to the Sun than Ceres. He proposed that the two objects were the remnants of a destroyed planet, and predicted that more of these pieces would be found.
- 1802 – Due their star-like apparience, William Herschel suggested Ceres and Pallas, and similar objects if found, be placed into a separate category, named asteroids, although they were still counted among the planets for some decades.
- 1804 – Karl Ludwig Harding discovers the asteroid Juno.
- 1807 – Olbers discovers the asteroid Vesta.
- 1821 – Alexis Bouvard detects irregularities in the orbit of Uranus.
- 1825 – Pierre Laplace completes his study of gravitation, the stability of the Solar System, tides, the precession of the equinoxes, the libration of the Moon, and Saturn's rings in his work Traité de mécanique céleste (Treatise of celestial mechanics).
- 1833 – Thomas Henderson successfully measures the stellar parallax of alpha Centauri, being then regarded as the Sun's closest star, but delayed the publication until 1839.
- 1838 – Friedrich Wilhelm Bessel measures the parallax of the star 61 Cygni, refuting one of the oldest arguments against heliocentrism.

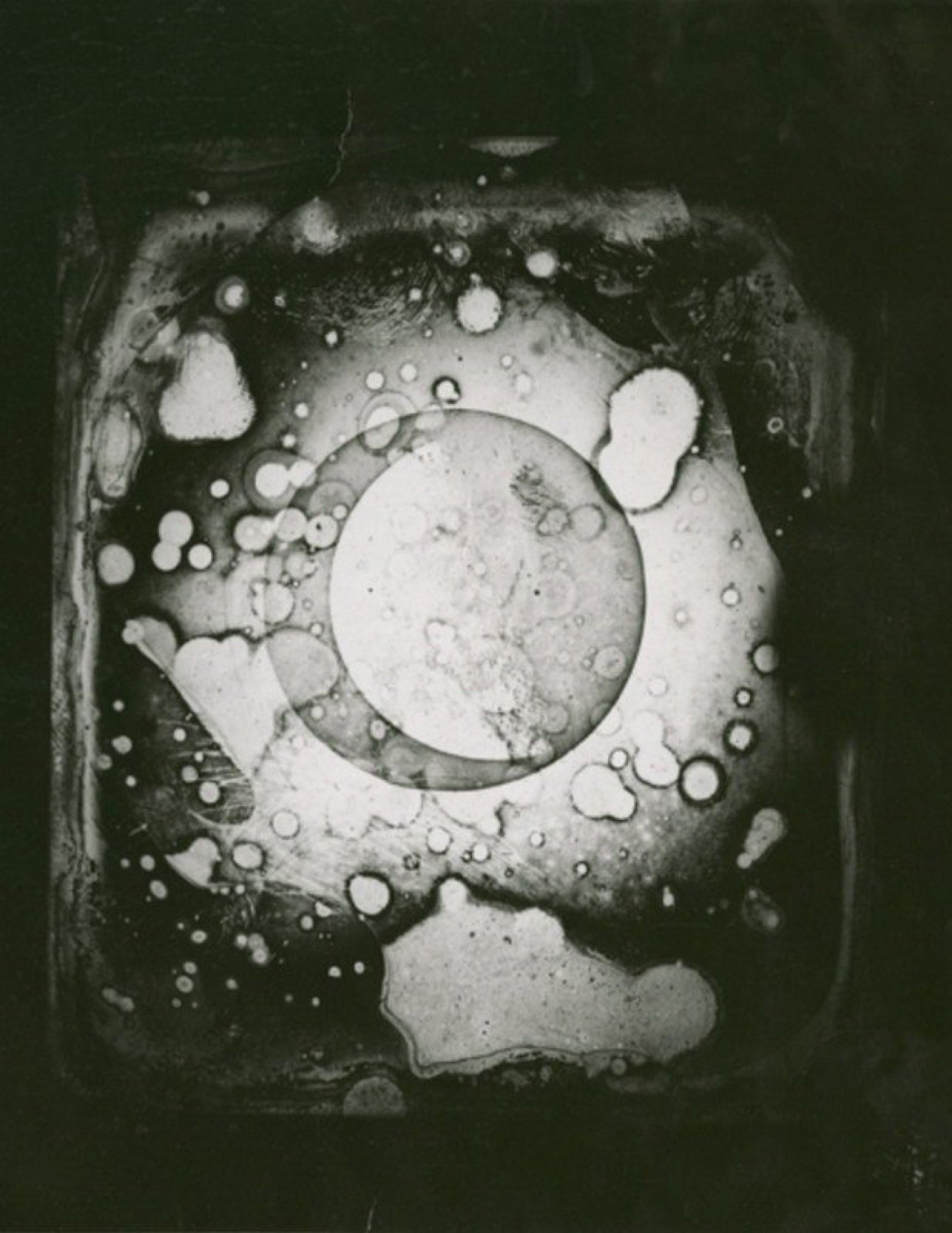
The earliest surviving dagerrotype of the Moon by Draper (1840)

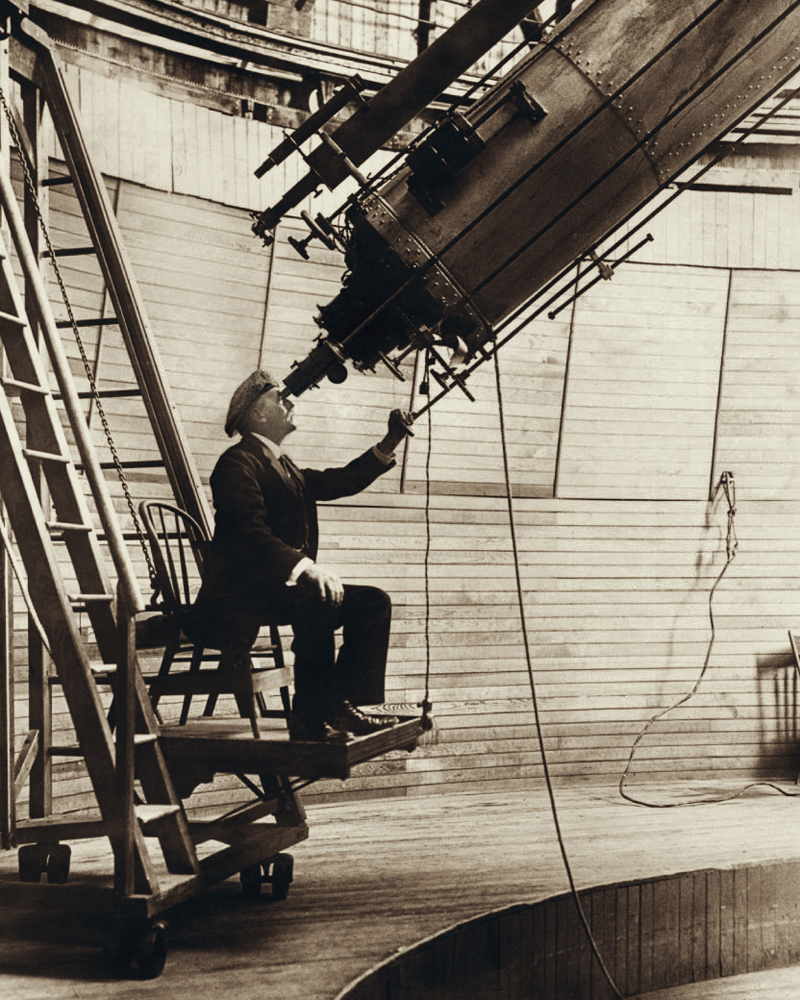
Percival Lowell in 1914, observing Venus in the daytime with the 24-inch (61 cm) Alvan Clark & Sons refracting telescope at Flagstaff, Arizona

- 1840 – John W. Draper takes a daguerreotype of the Moon, the first astronomical photograph.
- 1845 – John Adams predicts the existence and location of an eighth planet from irregularities in the orbit of Uranus.
- 1845 – Karl Ludwig Hencke discovers a fifth body between Mars and Jupiter, Astraea and, shortly thereafter, new objects were found there at an accelerating rate. Counting them among the planets became increasingly cumbersome. Eventually, they were dropped from the planet list (as first suggested by Alexander von Humboldt in the early 1850s) and Herschel's coinage, "asteroids", gradually came into common use. Since then, the region they occupy between Mars and Jupiter is known as the asteroid belt.
- 1846 – Urbain Le Verrier predicts the existence and location of an eighth planet from irregularities in the orbit of Uranus.
- 1846 – Johann Galle discovers the eighth planet, Neptune, following the predicted position gave to him by Le Verrier.
- 1846 – William Lassell discovers Neptune's moon Triton, just seventeen days later of planet's discovery.
- 1848 – Lassell, William Cranch Bond and George Phillips Bond discover Saturn's moon Hyperion.
- 1849 – Édouard Roche finds the limiting radius of tidal destruction and tidal creation for a body held together only by its own gravity, called the Roche limit, and uses it to explain why Saturn's rings do not condense into a satellite.
- 1849 – Annibale de Gasparis discovers the asteroid Hygiea, the fourth largest asteroid in the Solar System by both volume and mass.
- 1851 – Lassell discovers Uranus's moons Ariel and Umbriel.
- 1856 – James Clerk Maxwell demonstrates that a solid ring around Saturn would be torn apart by gravitational forces and argues that Saturn's rings consist of a multitude of tiny satellites.
- 1859 – Robert Bunsen and Gustav Kirchhoff develop the spectroscope, which they used to pioneer the identification of the chemical elements in the Sun, showing that the Sun contains mainly hydrogen, and also sodium.
- 1862 – By analysing the spectroscopic signature of the Sun and comparing it to those of other stars, Father Angelo Secchi determines that the Sun is itself a star.
- 1866 – Giovanni Schiaparelli realizes that meteor streams occur when the Earth passes through the orbit of a comet that has left debris along its path.
- 1868 – Jules Janssen observes a bright yellow line with a wavelength of 587.49 nanometers in the spectrum of the chromosphere of the Sun, during a total solar eclipse in Guntur, India. Later in the same year, Norman Lockyer observed the same line in the solar spectrum, and concluded that it was caused by an element in the Sun unknown on Earth. This element is helium, which currently comprises 23.8% of the mass in the solar photosphere.
- 1877 – Asaph Hall discovers Mars's moons Deimos and Phobos.
- 1887 – The Michelson–Morley experiment, intended to measure the relative motion of Earth through the (assumed) stationary luminiferous aether, got no results. This put an end to the centuries-old idea of the aether, dating back to Aristotle, and with it all the contemporary aether theories.
- 1892 – Edward Emerson Barnard discovers Jupiter's moon Amalthea.
- 1895 – Percival Lowell starts publishing books about his observations of features in the surface on Mars that he claimed as artificial Martian canals (due to a mistranslation of a previous paper by Schiaparelli on the subject), popularizing the long-held belief that these markings showed that Mars harbors intelligent life forms.
- 1897 – William Thomson, 1st Baron Kelvin, based on the thermal radiation rate and the gravitational contraction forces, argues the age of the Sun to be no more than 20 million years – unless some energy source beyond what was then known was found.
- 1899 – William Henry Pickering discovers Saturn's moon Phoebe.

== 1900–1957 ==
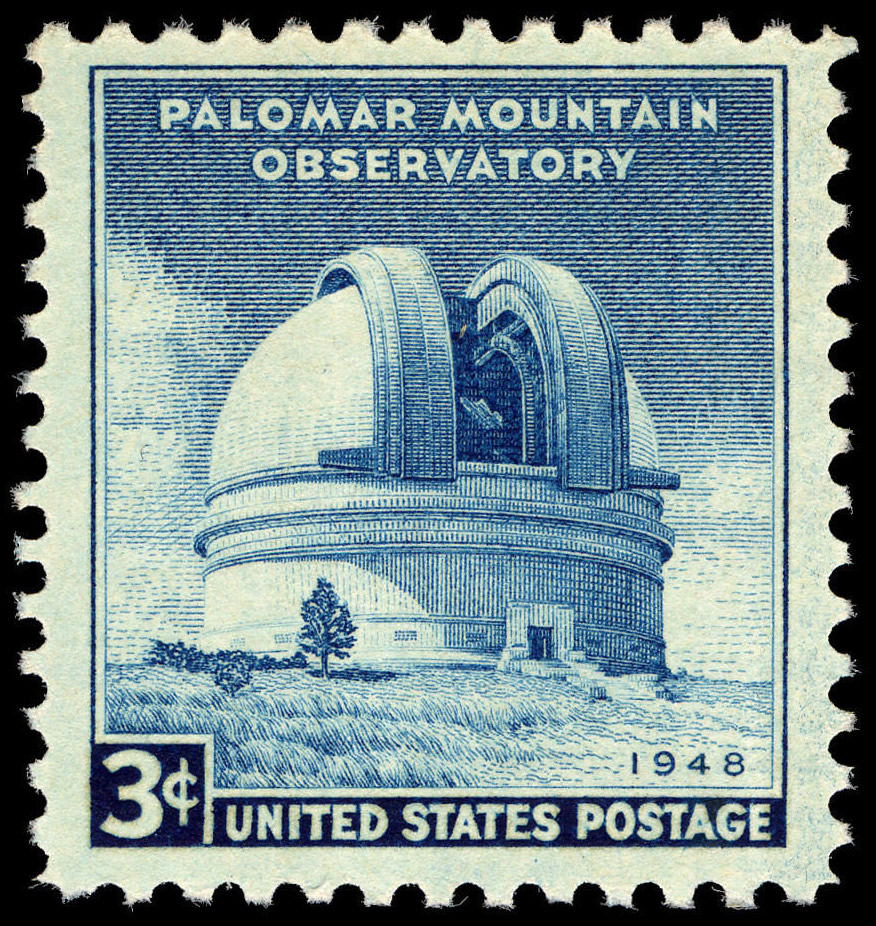
Palomar Mountain Observatory featured on 1948 United States stamp

- 1904 – Ernest Rutherford argues, in a lecture attended by Kelvin, that radioactive decay releases heat, providing the unknown energy source Kelvin had suggested, and ultimately leading to radiometric dating of rocks which reveals ages of billions of years for the Solar System bodies.
- 1906 – Max Wolf discovers the Trojan asteroid Achilles.
- 1908 – A meteor air burst occurs near Tunguska in Siberia, Russia. It is the largest impact event on Earth in recorded history to date.
- 1909 – Andrija Mohorovičić discovers the Moho discontinuity, the boundary between the Earth's crust and the mantle.
- 1912 – Alfred Wegener suggests the continental drift hypothesis, that the continents are slowly drifting around the Earth.
- 1915 – Robert Innes discovers Proxima Centauri, the closest star to Earth after the Sun.
- 1919 – Arthur Stanley Eddington uses a solar eclipse to successfully test Albert Einstein's General Theory of Relativity, which in turn explains the observed irregularities in the orbital motion of Mercury, and disproves the existence of the hypothesized inner planet Vulcan.
- 1920 – In the Great Debate between Harlow Shapley and Heber Curtis, galaxies are finally recognized as objects beyond the Milky Way, and the Milky Way as a galaxy proper. Within it lies the Solar System.
- 1930 – Clyde Tombaugh discovers Pluto. It was regarded for decades as the ninth planet of the Solar System.

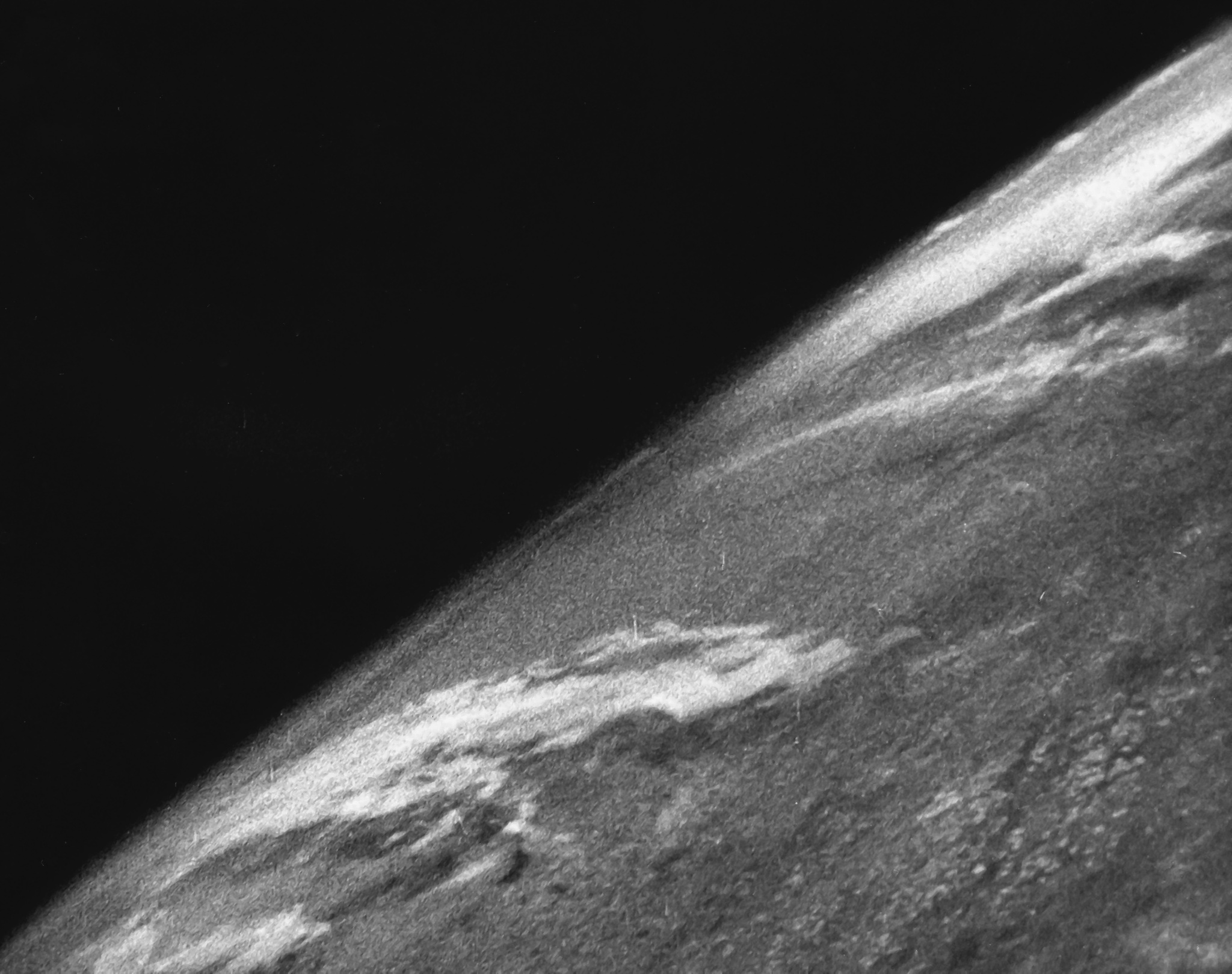
The first photo from space was taken from a V-2 launched by US scientists on 24 October 1946.

- 1930 – Seth Nicholson and Edison Pettit measure the surface temperature of the Moon.
- 1932 – Karl Guthe Jansky recognizes received radio signals coming from outer space as extrasolar, coming mainly from Sagittarius. They are the first evidence of the center of the Milky Way, and the firsts experiences that founded the discipline of radio astronomy.
- 1935 – The Explorer II balloon reached a record altitude of 22,066 m (72,395 ft), enabling its occupants to photograph the curvature of the Earth for the first time.
- 1938 – Hans Bethe calculates the details of the two main energy-producing nuclear reactions that power the Sun.
- 1944 – Gerard Kuiper discovers that the satellite Titan has a substantial atmosphere.
- 1946 – American launch of a camera-equipped V-2 rocket provides the first image of the Earth from space.
- 1949 – Gerard Kuiper discovers Uranus's moon Miranda and Neptune's moon Nereid.
- 1950 – Jan Oort suggests the presence of a cometary reservoir in the outer limits of the Solar System, the Oort cloud.
- 1951 – Gerard Kuiper argues for an annular reservoir of comets between 40 and 100 astronomical units from the Sun having formed early in the Solar System's evolution, but he did not think that such a belt still existed today. Decades later, this region was named after him, the Kuiper belt.

== 1958–1976 ==
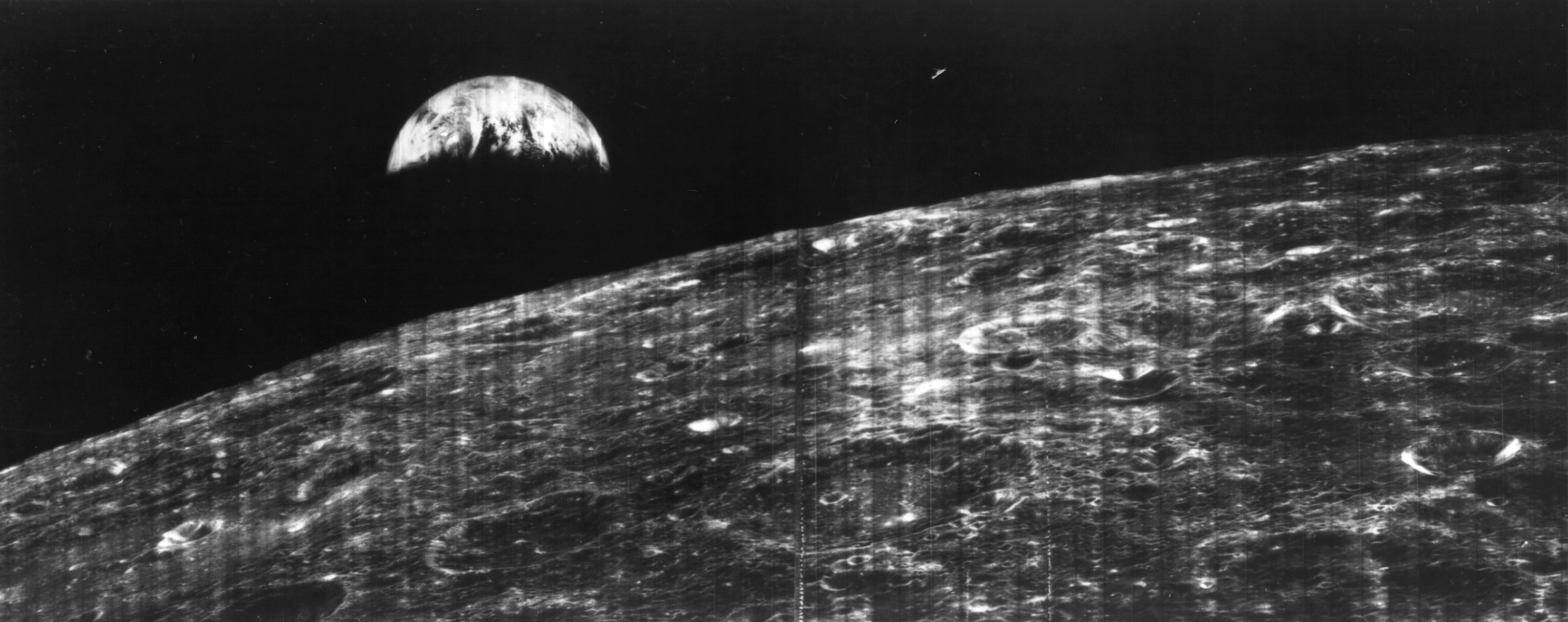
Earth taken from Lunar Orbiter 1 in 1966. Image as originally shown to the public displays extensive flaws and striping.

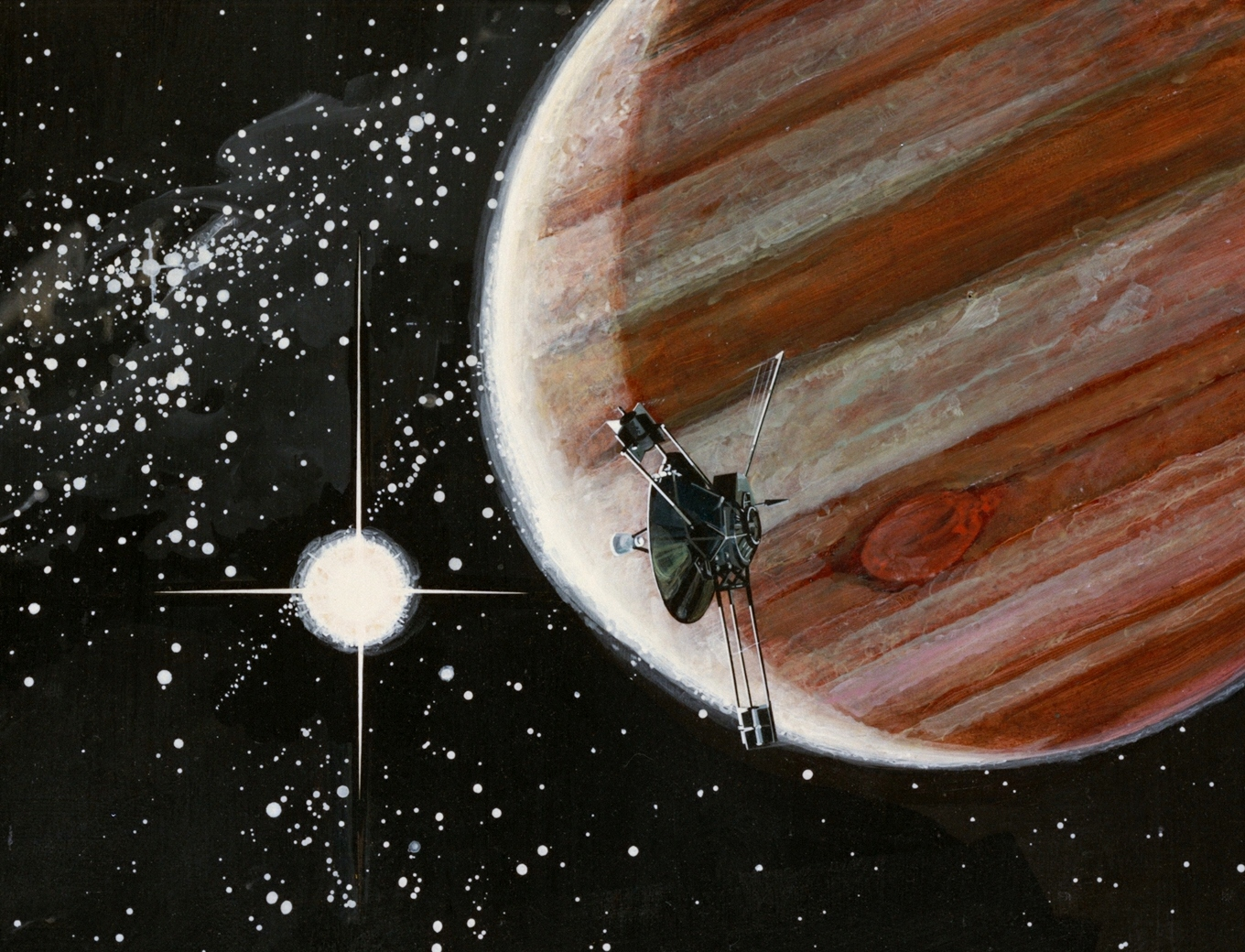
Artist's impression of Pioneer 10's flyby of Jupiter

- 1958 – Under supervision of James Van Allen, Explorer 1 and Explorer 3 confirmed the existence of the Earth's magnetosphere radiation belts, named after him.
- 1959 – Explorer 6 sends the first image of the entire Earth from space.
- 1959 – Luna 3 sends the first images of another celestial body, the Moon, from space, including its unseen far side.
- 1962 – Mariner 2 Venus flyby performs the first closeup observations of another planet.
- 1964 – Mariner 4 spacecraft provides the first detailed images of the surface of Mars.
- 1966 – Luna 9 Moon lander provides the first images from the surface of another celestial body.
- 1967 – Venera 4 provides the first information on Venus's dense atmosphere.
- 1968 – Apollo 8 becomes the first crewed lunar mission, providing historic images of the whole Earth.
- 1969 – Apollo 11 mission landed on the Moon, first humans walking upon it. They return the first lunar samples back to Earth.
- 1970 – Venera 7 Venus lander sends back the first information successfully obtained from the surface of another planet.
- 1971 – Mariner 9 Mars spacecraft becomes the first to successfully orbit another planet. It provides the first detailed maps of the Martian surface, discovering much of the planet's topography, including the volcano Olympus Mons and the canyon system Valles Marineris, which is named in its honor.
- 1971 – Mars 3 lands on Mars, and transmits the first partial image from the surface of another planet.
- 1973 – Skylab astronauts discover the Sun's coronal holes.
- 1973 – Pioneer 10 flies by Jupiter, providing the first closeup images of the planet and revealing its intense radiation belts.
- 1973 – Mariner 10 provides the first closeup images of the clouds of Venus.
- 1974 – Mariner 10 provides the first closeup images of the surface of Mercury.
- 1975 – Venera 9 becomes the first probe to successfully transmit images from the surface of Venus.
- 1976 – Viking 1 and 2 become the first probes to send images (in color) from the surface of Mars, as well as to perform in situ biological experiments with the Martian soil.

== 1977–2000 ==
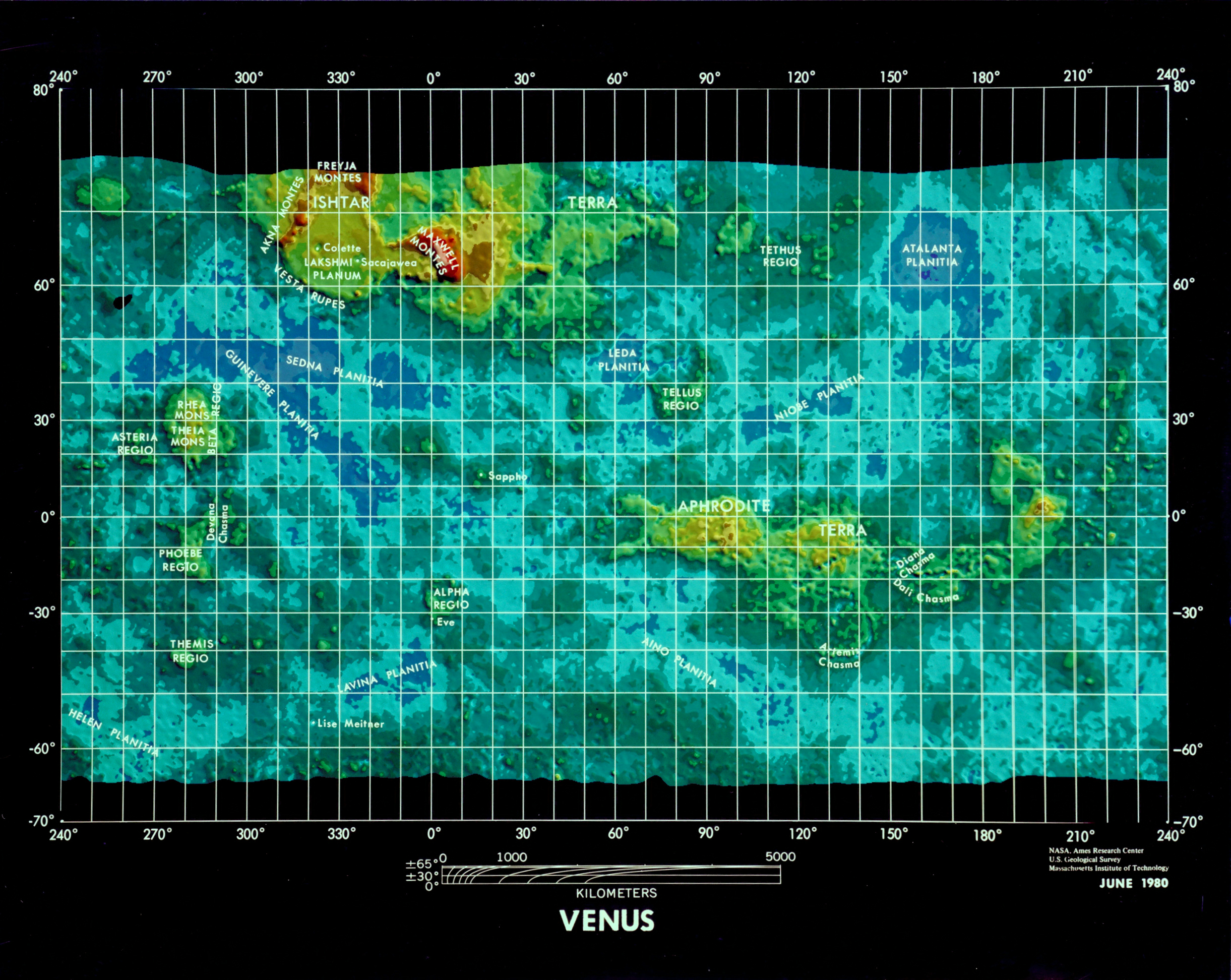
A map of Venus produced from Pioneer data

- 1977 – James Elliot discovers the rings of Uranus during a stellar occultation experiment on the Kuiper Airborne Observatory.
- 1977 – Charles Kowal discovers Chiron, the first centaur.
- 1978 – James Christy discovers Charon, the large moon of Pluto.
- 1978 – The Pioneer Venus probe maps the surface of Venus.
- 1978 – Peter Goldreich and Scott Tremaine present a Boltzmann equation model of planetary-ring dynamics for indestructible spherical ring particles that do not self-gravitate, and they find a stability requirement relation between ring optical depth and particle normal restitution coefficient.
- 1979 – Pioneer 11 flies by Saturn, providing the first ever closeup images of the planet and its rings. It discovers the planet's F ring and determines that its moon Titan has a thick atmosphere.
- 1979 – Goldreich and Tremaine postulate that Saturn's F ring is maintained by shepherd moons, a prediction that would be confirmed by observations.
- 1979 – Voyager 1 flies by Jupiter and discovers its faint ring system, as well as volcanoes on Io, the innermost of its Galilean moons.
- 1979 – Voyager 2 flies by Jupiter and discovers evidence of an ocean under the surface of its moon Europa.
- 1980 – Voyager 1 flies by Saturn and takes the first images of Titan. However, its atmosphere is opaque to visible light, so its surface remains obscured.
- 1982 – Venera 13 lands on Venus, sends the first photographs in color of its surface, and records atmospheric wind noises, the first sounds heard from another planet.
- 1986 – Voyager 2 provides the first ever detailed images of Uranus, its moons and rings.
- 1986 – The Giotto probe, part of an international effort known as the "Halley Armada", provides the first ever close up images of a comet, the Halley's Comet.
- 1988 – Martin Duncan, Thomas Quinn, and Scott Tremaine demonstrate that short-period comets come primarily from the Kuiper Belt and not the Oort cloud.
- 1989 – Voyager 2 provides the first ever detailed images of Neptune, its moons and rings.
- 1990 – The Hubble Space Telescope is launched. Aimed primarily at deep-space objects, it is also used to observe faint objects in the Solar System.
- 1990 – Voyager 1 is turned around to take the Portrait of the Planets of the Solar System, source of the Pale Blue Dot image of the Earth.
- 1991 – The Magellan spacecraft maps the surface of Venus.
- 1991 – The Galileo, while en route to Jupiter, encounters asteroid Gaspra, which became the first asteroid imaged by a spacecraft.
- 1992 – David C. Jewitt and Jane Luu of the University of Hawaii discover Albion, the first object deemed to be a member of the Kuiper belt.
- 1993 – Asteroid Ida is visited by the Galileo before heading to Jupiter. Mission member Ann Harch discovers its natural satellite Dactyl in images returned by the spacecraft, the first asteroid moon discovered.
- 1994 – Comet Shoemaker–Levy collides with Jupiter, providing the first direct observation of an extraterrestrial collision of Solar System objects.
- 1995 – The Galileo becomes the first spacecraft to orbit Jupiter. Its atmospheric entry probe provides the first data taken within the planet itself.
- 1997 – Mars Pathfinder deploys on Mars the first rover to operate outside the Earth–Moon system, the Sojourner, which conducts many experiments on the Martian surface, both teleoperated and semi-autonomous.
- 2000 – NEAR Shoemaker probe provides the first detailed images of a near-Earth asteroid, Eros.

== 2001–present ==
- 2002 – Chad Trujillo and Michael Brown of Caltech at the Palomar Observatory discover the minor planet Quaoar in the Kuiper belt.
- 2003 – M. Brown, C. Trujillo, and David Rabinowitz discover Sedna, a large trans-Neptunian object (TNO) with an unprecedented 12,000-year orbit.
- 2003 – Voyager 1 enters the termination shock, the point where the solar wind slows to subsonic speeds.
- 2004 – Voyager 1 sends back the first data ever obtained from within the Solar System's heliosheath.
- 2004 – M. Brown, C. Trujillo, and D. Rabinowitz discover the TNO Orcus.
- 2004 – M. Brown, C. Trujillo, and D. Rabinowitz discover the Kuiper Belt Object (KBO) Haumea. A second team led by José Luis Ortiz Moreno also claims the discovery.
- 2004 – The Cassini–Huygens spacecraft becomes the first to orbit Saturn. It discovers complex motions in the rings, several new small moons and cryovolcanism on the moon Enceladus, studies the Saturn's hexagon, and provides the first images from the surface of Titan.
- 2005 – M. Brown, C. Trujillo, and D. Rabinowitz discover Eris, a TNO more massive than Pluto, and later, by other team led by Brown, also its moon, Dysnomia. Eris was first imaged in 2003, and is the most massive object discovered in the Solar System since Neptune's moon Triton in 1846.
- 2005 – M. Brown, C. Trujillo, and D. Rabinowitz discover another notable KBO, Makemake.
- 2005 – The Mars Exploration Rovers perform the first astronomical observations ever taken from the surface of another planet, imaging an eclipse by Mars's moon Phobos.

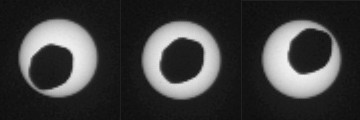
Annular eclipse of the Sun by Phobos as viewed by the Mars Curiosity rover (20 August 2013).

- 2005 – Hayabusa spacecraft lands on asteroid Itokawa and collect samples. It returned the samples to Earth in 2010.
- 2006 – The 26th General Assembly of the IAU voted in favor of a revised definition of a planet and officially declared Ceres, Pluto, and Eris dwarf planets.
- 2007 – Dwarf planet Gonggong, a large KBO, was discovered by Megan Schwamb, M. Brown, and D. Rabinowitz.
- 2008 – The IAU declares Makemake and Haumea dwarf planets.
- 2011 – Dawn spacecraft enters orbit around the large asteroid Vesta making detailed measurements.
- 2012 – Saturn's moon Methone is imaged up close by the Cassini spacecraft, revealing a remarkably smooth surface.
- 2012 – Dawn spacecraft breaks orbit of Vesta and heads for Ceres.
- 2013 – MESSENGER spacecraft provides the first ever complete map of the surface of Mercury.
- 2013 – A team led by Felipe Braga Ribas discover a ring system around the minor planet and centaur Chariklo, the first of this kind ever detected.
- 2014 – Rosetta spacecraft becomes the first comet orbiter (around 67P/Churyumov–Gerasimenko), and deploys on it the first comet lander Philae that collected close-up data from the comet's surface.
- 2015 – Dawn spacecraft enters orbit around the dwarf planet Ceres making detailed measurements.
- 2015 – New Horizons spacecraft flies by Pluto, providing the first ever sharp images of its surface, and its largest moon Charon.
- 2017 – ʻOumuamua, the first known interstellar object crossing the Solar System, is identified.
- 2019 – Closest approach of New Horizons to Arrokoth, a KBO farther than Pluto.
- 2019 – 2I/Borisov, the first interstellar comet and second interstellar object, is discovered.
- 2022 – The Double Asteroid Redirection Test (DART) spacecraft mission intentionally crashed into Dimorphos, the minor-planet moon of the asteroid Didymos, deviating (slightly) the orbit of a Solar System body for the first time ever. While DART hosted no scientific payload, its camera took closeup photos of the two objects, and a secondary spacecraft, the LICIACube, also gathered related scientific data.
- 2025 – 3I/ATLAS, the second interstellar comet and third interstellar object, is discovered.

== See also ==
- Discovery and exploration of the Solar System
- Timeline of discovery of Solar System planets and their moons
- Timeline of Solar System exploration
- Timeline of first images of Earth from space
- List of former planets
- List of hypothetical Solar System objects in astronomy
- Historical models of the Solar System
- History of astronomy
- Timeline of cosmological theories

The number of currently known, or observed, objects of the Solar System are in the hundreds of thousands. Many of them are listed in the following articles:

- List of Solar System objects
- List of gravitationally rounded objects of the Solar System
- List of natural satellites
- List of possible dwarf planets
- List of minor planets (numbered) and List of unnumbered minor planets
- List of trans-Neptunian objects (numbered) and List of unnumbered trans-Neptunian objects
- Lists of comets
