= Historical models of the Solar System =

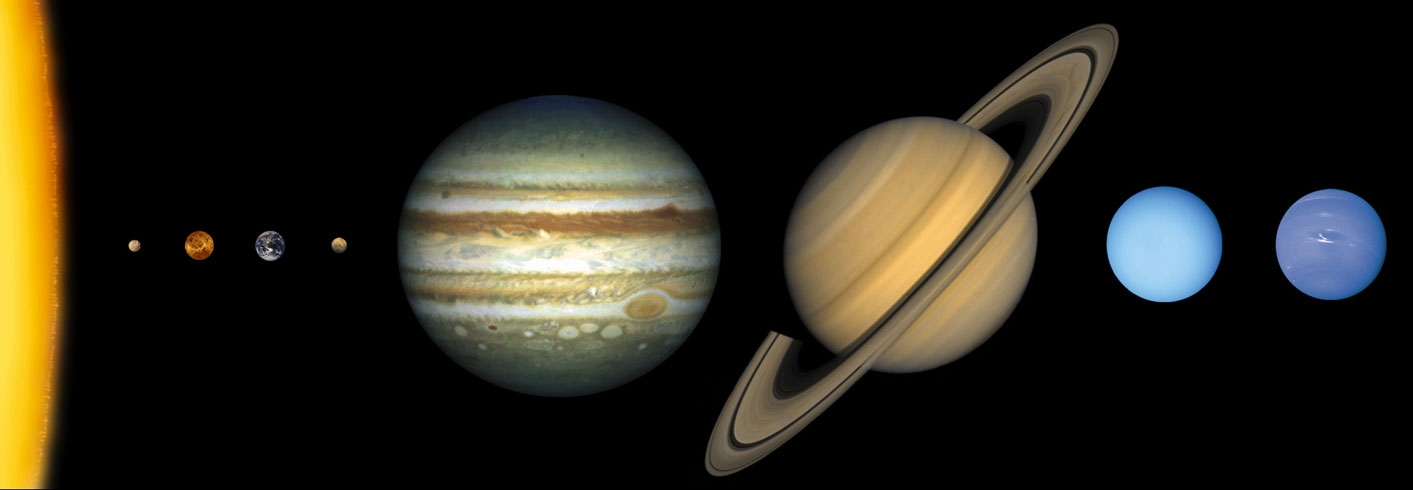
Approximate sizes of the planets relative to each other. Outward from the Sun, the planets are Mercury, Venus, Earth, Mars, Jupiter, Saturn, Uranus and Neptune. Jupiter's diameter is about 11 times that of the Earth's and the Sun's diameter is about 10 times Jupiter's. The planets are not shown at the appropriate distance from the Sun.

Historical models of the Solar System first appeared during prehistoric periods and remain updated to this day. The models of the Solar System throughout history were first represented in the early form of cave markings and drawings, calendars and astronomical symbols. Then books and written records became the main source of information that expressed the way the people of the time thought of the Solar System.

New models of the Solar System are usually built on previous models, thus, the early models are kept track of by intellectuals in astronomy, an extended progress from trying to perfect the geocentric model eventually using the heliocentric model of the Solar System. The use of the Solar System model began as a resource to signify particular periods during the year as well as a navigation tool which was exploited by many leaders from the past.

Past astronomers and prominent thinkers recorded their observations and sought to develop models that accurately interpreted their findings. This approach to modeling the Solar System facilitated advancements towards more precise representations, ultimately enhancing our comprehension of the Solar System.

== Early astronomy ==
=== The Nebra Sky Disc ===
The Nebra Sky Disc is a bronze dish with symbols that are interpreted generally as the Sun or full moon, a lunar crescent, and stars (including a cluster of seven stars interpreted as the Pleiades). The disc has been attributed to a site in present-day Germany near Nebra, Saxony-Anhalt, and was originally dated by archaeologists to c. 1600 BCE, based on the provenance provided by the looters who found it. Researchers initially suggested the disc is an artefact from the Bronze Age Unetice culture, although a later dating to the Iron Age has also been proposed.

=== Firmament ===
The ancient Hebrews, like all the ancient peoples of the Near East, believed the sky was a solid dome with the Sun, Moon, planets and stars embedded in it. In biblical cosmology, the firmament is the vast solid dome created by God during his creation of the world to divide the primal sea into upper and lower portions so that the dry land could appear.

=== Babylonian interpretation ===
Babylonians thought the universe revolved around heaven and Earth. They used methodological observations of the patterns of planets and stars movements to predict future possibilities such as eclipses. Babylonians were able to make use of periodic appearances of the Moon to generate a time source - a calendar. This was developed as the appearance of the full moon was visible every month. The 12 months came about by dividing the ecliptic into 12 equal segments of 30 degrees and were given zodiacal constellation names which were later used by the Greeks.

=== Chinese theories ===
The Chinese had multiple theories of the structure of the universe. The first theory is the Gaitian (celestial lid) theory, mentioned in an old mathematical text called Zhou bei suan jing in 100 BCE, in which the Earth is within the heaven, where the heaven acts as a dome or a lid. The second theory is the Huntian (Celestial sphere) theory during 100 BCE. This theory claims that the Earth floats on the water that the Heaven contains, which was accepted as the default theory until 200 AD. The Xuanye (Ubiquitous darkness) theory attempts to simplify the structure by implying that the Sun, Moon and the stars are just a highly dense vapour that floats freely in space with no periodic motion.

== Greek astronomy ==
Since 600 BCE, Greek thinkers noticed the periodic fashion of the Solar System (then regarded as the "whole universe") but, like their contemporaries, they were puzzled about the forward and retrograde motion of the planets, the "wanderer stars", long taken as heavenly deities. Many theories were announced during this period, mostly purely speculative, but progressively supported by geometry.

Thales of Miletus alleged to have predicted the solar eclipse of 586 BCE. Around 475 BCE, Parmenides claimed that the universe is spherical and moonlight is a reflection of sunlight. Shortly after, circa 450 BCE, Anaxagoras was the first philosopher to consider the Sun as a huge object (larger than the land of Peloponnesus), and consequently, to realize how far from Earth it might be. He also suggested that the Moon is rocky, thus opaque, and closer to the Earth than the Sun, giving a correct explanation of eclipses. To him, comets are formed by collisions of planets and that the motion of planets is controlled by the nous (mind).

=== Anaximander cosmology ===
Map of Anaximander's universe

Anaximander, around 560 BCE, was the first to conceive a mechanical model of the world. In his model, the Earth floats very still in the centre of the infinite, not supported by anything. Its curious shape is that of a cylinder with a height one-third of its diameter. The flat top forms the inhabited world, which is surrounded by a circular oceanic mass.

At the origin, after the separation of hot and cold, a ball of flame appeared that surrounded Earth. This ball broke apart to form the rest of the Universe. It resembled a system of hollow concentric wheels, filled with fire, with the rims pierced by holes. Consequently, the Sun was the fire that one could see through a hole the same size as the Earth on the farthest wheel, and an eclipse corresponded with the occlusion of that hole. The diameter of the solar wheel was twenty-seven times that of the Earth (or twenty-eight, depending on the sources) and the lunar wheel, whose fire was less intense, eighteen (or nineteen) times. Its hole could change shape, thus explaining lunar phases. The stars and the planets, located closer, followed the same model.

Anaximander was the first philosopher to present a system where the celestial bodies turned at different distances.

=== Pythagorean astronomical system ===
Philolaus believed there was a "Counter-Earth" (Antichthon) orbiting the "Central Fire" (not labeled) that was not visible from Earth. The upper illustration depicts Earth at night while the lower one depicts Earth in the day.

Around 400 BCE, Pythagoras' students believed the motion of planets is caused by an out-of-sight "fire" at the centre of the universe (not the Sun) that powers them, and Sun and Earth orbit that Central Fire at different distances. The Earth's inhabited side is always opposite to the Central Fire, rendering it invisible to people. So, the Earth rotates around itself synchronously with a daily orbit around that Central Fire, while the Sun revolves it yearly in a higher orbit. That way, the inhabited side of Earth faces the Sun once every 24 hours. They also claimed that the Moon and the planets orbit the Earth. This model is usually attributed to Philolaus.

This model is the first one that depicts a moving Earth, simultaneously self-rotating and orbiting around an external point (but not around the Sun), thus not being geocentrical, contrary to common intuition.

Due to philosophical concerns about the number 10 (a "perfect number" for the Pythagorians), they also added a tenth "hidden body" or Counter-Earth (Antichthon), always in the opposite side of the invisible Central Fire and therefore also invisible from Earth.

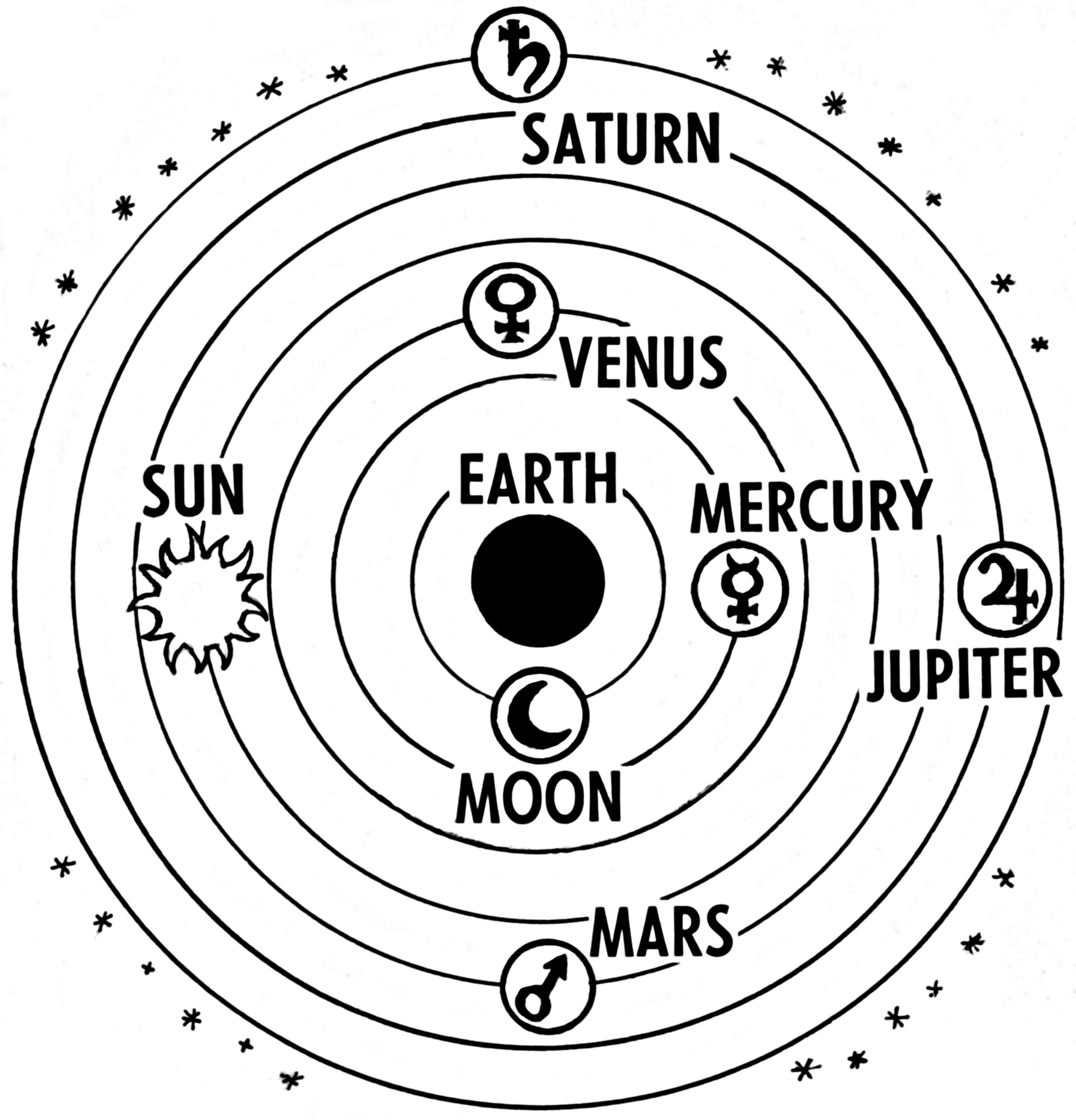
This is the geocentric model of the Solar System with the Earth at the centre.

=== Platonic geocentrism ===
Around 360 BCE Plato wrote in his Timaeus his idea to account for the motions; he claimed that circles and spheres were the preferred shape of the universe and that the Earth was at the centre and the stars forming the outermost shell, followed by planets, the Sun and the Moon. This is the so-called geocentric model.

In Plato's cosmogony, the demiurge gave the primacy to the motion of Sameness and left it undivided; but he divided the motion of Difference in six parts, to have seven unequal circles. He prescribed these circles to move in opposite directions, three of them with equal speeds, the others with unequal speeds, but always in proportion. These circles are the orbits of the heavenly bodies: the three moving at equal speeds are the Sun, Venus and Mercury, while the four moving at unequal speeds are the Moon, Mars, Jupiter and Saturn. The complicated pattern of these movements is bound to be repeated again after a period called a 'complete' or 'perfect' year.

So, Plato arranged these celestial orbs in the order (outwards from the center): Moon, Sun, Venus, Mercury, Mars, Jupiter, Saturn, and fixed stars, with the fixed stars located on the celestial sphere. However, this did not suffice to explain the observed planetary motion.

=== Concentric spheres ===
Animation depicting Eudoxus' model of retrograde planetary motion. The two innermost homocentric spheres of his model are represented as rings here, each turning with the same period but in opposite directions, moving the planet along a figure-eight, or hippopede

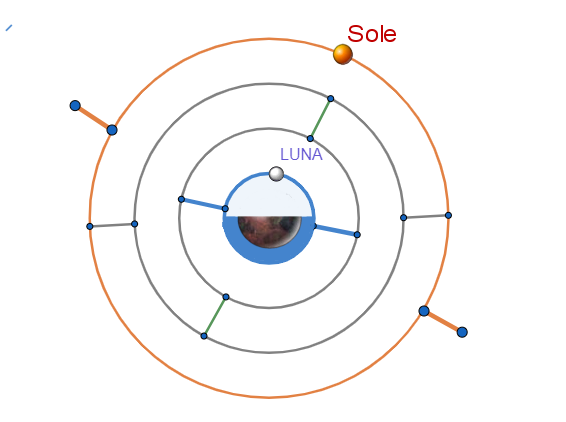
Schematic model likely representing the first 4, out of a total of 27, spheres of Eudoxus' cosmic model following Giovanni Schiaparell. Each sphere has its own rotational axis that, together, generates a complex motion for the planet, in this illustration, the moon.

Eudoxus of Cnidus, student of Plato in around 380 BCE, introduced a technique to describe the motion of the planets called the method of exhaustion. Eudoxus reasoned that since the distances of the stars, the Moon, the Sun and all known planets do not appear to be changing, they are fixed in a sphere in which the bodies move around the sphere but with a constant radius and the Earth is at the centre of the sphere. To explain the complexity of the movements of the planets, Eudoxus thought they move as if they were attached to a number of concentrical, invisible spheres, every of them rotating around its own and different axis and at different paces.

Eudoxus’ model had twenty-seven homocentric spheres with each sphere explaining a type of observable motion for each celestial object. Eudoxus assigns one sphere for the fixed stars which is supposed to explain their daily movement. He assigns three spheres to both the Sun and the Moon with the first sphere moving in the same manner as the sphere of the fixed stars. The second sphere explains the movement of the Sun and the Moon on the ecliptic plane. The third sphere was supposed to move on a “latitudinally inclined” circle and explain the latitudinal motion of the Sun and the Moon in the cosmos. Four spheres were assigned to Mercury, Venus, Mars, Jupiter, and Saturn, the only known planets at that time. The first and second spheres of the planets moved exactly like the first two spheres of the Sun and the Moon. According to Simplicius, the third and fourth sphere of the planets were supposed to move in a way that created a curve known as a hippopede. The hippopede was a way to try and explain the retrograde motions of planets.

Eudoxus emphasised that this is a purely mathematical construct of the model in the sense that the spheres of each celestial body do not exist, it just shows the possible positions of the bodies.

Around 350 BCE Aristotle, in his chief cosmological treatise De Caelo (On the Heavens), modified Eudoxus' model by supposing the spheres were material and crystalline. He was able to articulate the spheres for most planets, however, the spheres for Jupiter and Saturn crossed each other. Aristotle solved this complication by introducing an unrolled sphere in between, increasing the number of spheres needed well above Eudoxus'. Historians are unsure about how many spheres Aristotle thought there were in the cosmos with theories ranging from 43 up to 55.

Aristotle also tried to determine whether the Earth moves and concluded that all the celestial bodies fall towards Earth by natural tendency and since Earth is the centre of that tendency, it is stationary.

=== Incipient heliocentrism ===
By 330 BCE, Heraclides of Pontus said that the rotation of the Earth on its axis, from west to east, once every 24 hours, explained the apparent daily motion of the celestial sphere. Simplicius says that Heraclides proposed that the irregular movements of the planets can be explained if the Earth moves while the Sun stays still, but these statements are disputed.

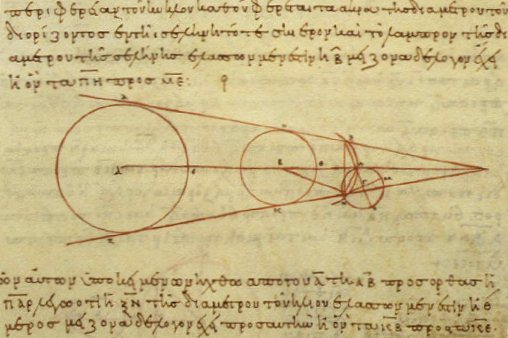
Aristarchus' 3rd century BC calculations on the relative sizes of the Sun, Earth, and Moon, from a 10th-century AD Greek copy

Around 280 BCE, Aristarchus of Samos offers the first definite discussion of the possibility of a heliocentric cosmos, and uses the size of the Earth's shadow on the Moon to estimate the Moon's orbital radius at 60 Earth radii, and its physical radius as one-third that of the Earth. He made an inaccurate attempt to measure the distance to the Sun, but sufficient to assert that the Sun is bigger than Earth and it is further away than the Moon. So the minor body, the Earth, must orbit the major one, the Sun, and not the opposite.

Following the heliocentric ideas of Aristarcus (but not explicitly supporting them), around 250 BCE Archimedes in his work The Sand Reckoner computes the diameter of the universe centered around the Sun to be about 10^{14} stadia (in modern units, about 2 light years, 18.93×10^{12} km, 11.76×10^{12} mi).

In Archimedes' own words:

His [Aristarchus'] hypotheses are that the fixed stars and the Sun remain unmoved, that the Earth revolves about the Sun on the circumference of a circle, the Sun lying in the middle of the orbit, and that the sphere of fixed stars, situated about the same center as the Sun, is so great that the circle in which he supposes the Earth to revolve bears such a proportion to the distance of the fixed stars as the center of the sphere bears to its surface.

However, Aristarchus' views were not widely adopted, and the geocentric notion will remain for centuries.

=== Further developments ===
The epicycles of the planets in orbit around Earth (Earth at the centre). The path-line is the combined motion of the planet's orbit (deferent) around Earth and within the orbit itself (epicycle).

Around 210 BCE, Apollonius of Perga shows the equivalence of two descriptions of the apparent retrograde planet motions (assuming the geocentric model), one using eccentrics and another deferent and epicycles. The latter will be a key feature for future models. The epicycle is described as a small orbit within a greater one, called the deferent: as a planet orbits the Earth, it also orbits the original orbit, so its trajectory resembles an epitrochoid, as shown in the illustration at left. This could explain how the planet seems to move as viewed from Earth.

In the following century, measures of sizes and distances of the Earth and the Moon are improved. Around 200 BCE Eratosthenes determines that the radius of the Earth is roughly 6,400 km. Circa 150 BCE Hipparchus uses parallax to determine that the distance to the Moon is roughly 380,000 km.

The work of Hipparchus about the Earth-Moon system was so accurate that he could forecast solar and lunar eclipses for the next six centuries. Also, he discovers the precession of the equinoxes, and compiles a star catalog of about 850 entries.

The basic elements of Ptolemaic astronomy, showing a planet on an epicycle (smaller dashed circle), a deferent (larger dashed circle), the eccentric (×) and an equant (•).

During the period 127 to 141 AD, Ptolemy deduced that the Earth is spherical based on the fact that not everyone records the solar eclipse at the same time and that observers from the North can not see the Southern stars. Ptolemy attempted to resolve the Planetary motion dilemma in which the observations were not consistent with the perfect circular orbits of the bodies. Ptolemy adopted the Apollonius' epicycles as solution. Ptolemy emphasised that the epicycle motion does not apply to the Sun. His main contribution to the model was the equant points. He also re-arranged the heavenly spheres in a different order than Plato did (from Earth outward): Moon, Mercury, Venus, Sun, Mars, Jupiter, Saturn and fixed stars, following a long astrological tradition and the decreasing orbital periods.

Ptolemy's work Almagest cemented the geocentric model in the West, and it remained the most authoritative text on astronomy for more than 1,500 years. His methods were accurate enough to keep them largely undisputed.

== Medieval astronomy ==
=== Capellas' astronomical model ===
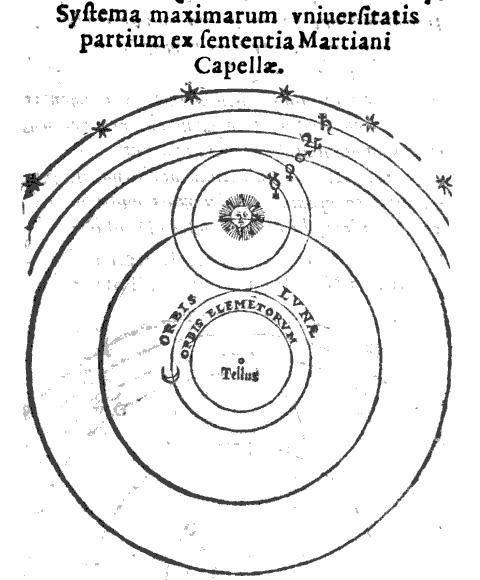
Naboth's representation of Martianus Capella's geo-heliocentric astronomical model (1573)

Around 420 AD Martianus Capella describes a modified geocentric model, in which the Earth is at rest in the center of the universe and circled by the Moon, the Sun, three planets and the stars, while Mercury and Venus circle the Sun. His model was not widely accepted, despite his authority; he was one of the earliest developers of the system of the seven liberal arts, the trivium (grammar, logic, and rhetoric) and the quadrivium (arithmetic, geometry, music, astronomy), that structured early medieval education. Nonetheless, his single encyclopedic work, De nuptiis Philologiae et Mercurii ("On the Marriage of Philology and Mercury"), also called De septem disciplinis ("On the seven disciplines") was read, taught, and commented upon throughout the early Middle Ages and shaped European education during the early medieval period and the Carolingian Renaissance.

This model implies some knowledge about the transits of Mercury and Venus in front of the Sun, and the fact they pass also behind it periodically, which cannot be explained with Ptolemy's model. But it is unclear how that knowledge could be achieved by that times, due to the difficult to see these transits at naked eye; indeed, there is no evidence that any ancient culture knew of the transits.

Alternatively, as seen from Earth, Mercury never departs from the Sun, neither East nor West, more than 28° and Venus no more than 47°, facts both known from antiquity that also could not be explained by Ptolemy. So it could be inferred that they orbit the Sun, and hence, there should be these transits.

=== Islamic astronomy ===
The Islamic golden age period in Baghdad, picking off from Ptolemy's work, had more accurate measurements taken followed by interpretations. In 1021 A.D, Ibn Al Haytham adjusted Ptolemy's geocentric model to his specialty in optics in his book Al-shukuk 'ata Batlamyus which translates to "Doubts about Ptolemy". Ibn al-Haytham claimed that the epicycles Ptolemy introduced are inclined planes, not in a flat motion which settled further conflicting disputes. However, Ibn Al Haytham agreed with the Earth being in the centre of the Solar System at a fixed position.

Nasir al-Din, during the 13th century, was able to combine two possible methods for a planet to orbit and as a result, derived a rotational aspect of planets within their orbits. Copernicus arrived to the same conclusion in the 16th century. Ibn al-Shatir, during the 14th century, in an attempt to resolve Ptolemy's inconsistent lunar theory, applied a double epicycle model to the Moon which reduced the predicted displacement of the Moon from the Earth. Copernicus also arrived at the same conclusion in the 16th century.

=== Chinese Astronomy ===
In 1051, Shen Kua, a Chinese scholar in applied mathematics, rejected the circular planetary motion. He substituted it with a different motion described by the term ‘willow-leaf’. This is when a planet has a circular orbit but then it encounters another small circular orbit within or outside the original orbit and then returns to its original orbit which is demonstrated by the figure on the right.

== Renaissance ==
=== Copernicus's Heliocentric Model ===
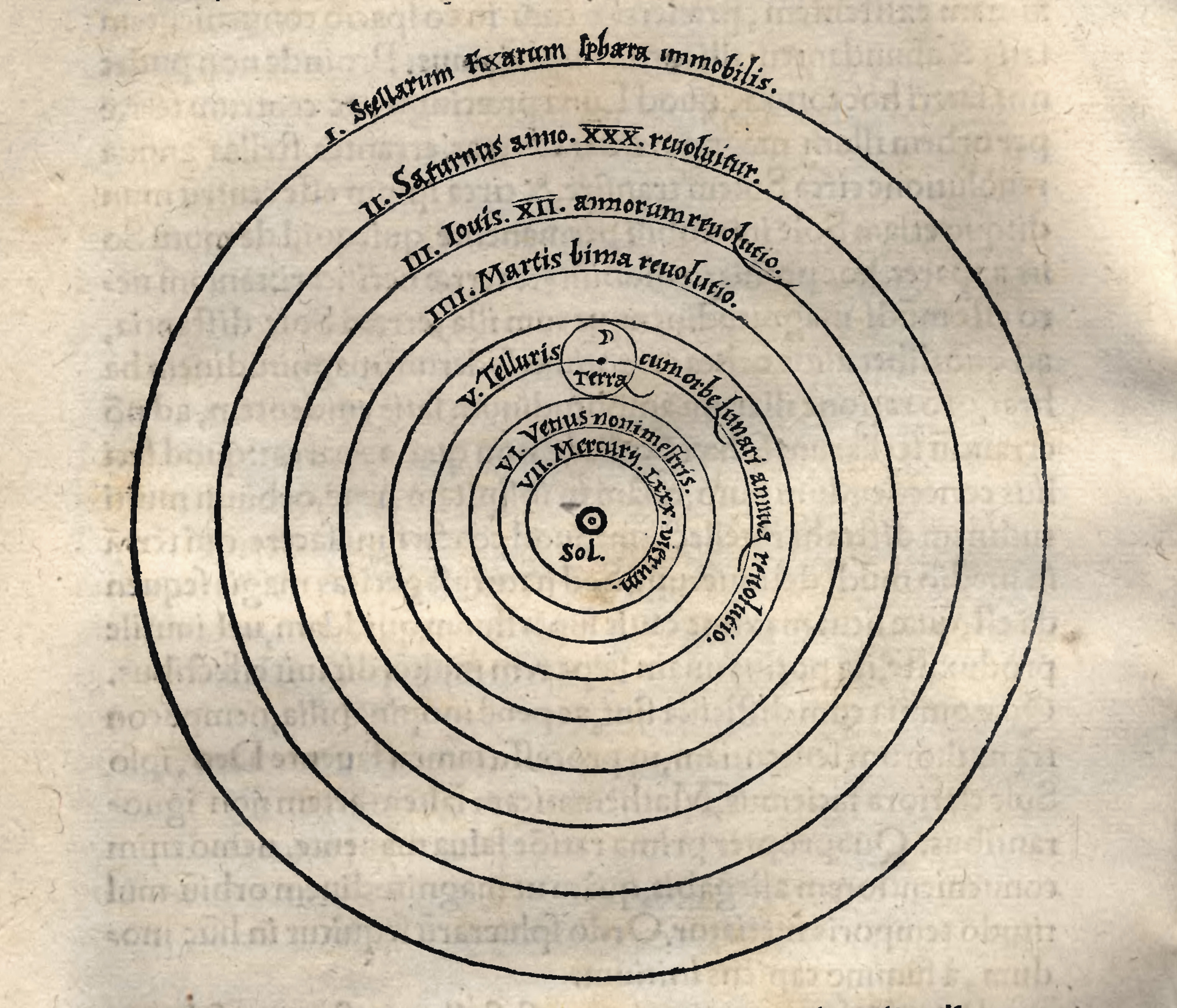
Heliocentric model from Nicolaus Copernicus' De revolutionibus orbium coelestium (On the Revolutions of the Heavenly Spheres)

During the 16th century Nicholas Copernicus, in reflecting on Ptolemy and Aristotle's interpretations of the Solar System, believed that all the orbits of the planets and Moon must be a perfect uniform circular motion despite the observations showing the complex retrograde motion. Copernicus introduced a new model which was consistent with the observations and allowed for perfect circular motion. This is known as the Heliocentric model where the Sun is placed at the centre of the universe (hence, the Solar System) and the Earth is, like all the other planets, orbiting it. The heliocentric model also resolved the varying brightness of planets problem. Copernicus also supported the spherical Earth theory with the idea that nature prefers spherical limits which are seen in the Moon, the Sun, and also the orbits of planets. Copernicus furthermore believed that the universe had a spherical limit. Copernicus contributed further to practical Astronomy by producing advanced techniques of observations and measurements and providing instructional procedure.

The heliocentric model implies that the Earth is also a planet, the third from the Sun after Mercury and Venus, and before Mars, Jupiter and Saturn. And also implicitly, that planets are "worlds", like Earth is, not "stars". But the Moon still orbits the Earth.

=== The Tychonic system ===
The Tychonic system shown in colour, with the objects that rotate around the Earth shown on blue orbits, and the objects that rotate around the Sun shown on orange orbits. Around all is a sphere of stars, which rotates.

The heliocentric model was not immediately adopted. Conservatism along to numerous observational, philosophical and religious concerns prevented it for more than a century.

In 1588, Tycho Brahe published his own Tychonic system, a blend between the Ptolemy's classical geocentric model and Copernicus' heliocentric model, in which the Sun and the Moon revolve around the Earth, in the center of universe, and all other planets revolve around the Sun. It was an attempt to conciliate his religious beliefs with heliocentrism. This was the so-called geoheliocentric model, and it was adopted by some astronomers during the geocentrism vs heliocentrism disputes.

=== Kepler's model ===
A visual representation of the Earth-orbiting around the Sun in an elliptical orbit.

In 1609, Johannes Kepler, an advocate of the heliocentric model, using his patron Tycho Brahe's accurate measurements, noticed the inconsistency of a heliocentric model where the Sun is exactly in the centre. Instead Kepler developed a more accurate and consistent model where the Sun is located not in the centre but at one of the two foci of an elliptic orbit.

Kepler derived the three laws of planetary motion which changed the model of the Solar System and the orbital path of planets. These three laws of planetary motion are:

1. All planets orbit the Sun in elliptical orbits (image on the right) and not perfectly circular orbits.
2. The radius vector joining the planet and the Sun has an equal area in equal periods.
3. The square of the period of the planet (one revolution around the Sun) is proportional to the cube of the average distance from the Sun.

In modern notation,

$\frac{a^3}{T^2}=\frac{GM}{4\pi^2}$

where a is the radius of the orbit, T is the period, G is the gravitational constant and M is the mass of the Sun. The third law explains the periods that occur during the year which relates the distance between the Earth and the Sun.

Along with unprecedent accuracy, the Keplerian model also allows put the Solar System into scale. If a reliable measure between planetary bodies would be taken, the whole size of the system could be computed. By this time, the Solar System started to be conceived as something smaller than the rest of the universe. (Yet, up to 1596 Kepler himself still believed in the sphere of fixed stars, as it was illustrated in his book Mysterium Cosmopgraphicum.)

=== Galileo's discoveries ===
With the help of the telescope providing a closer look into the sky, Galileo Galilei proved the most part of the heliocentric model of the Solar System. Galileo observed the phases of Venus's appearance with the telescope and was able to confirm Kepler's first law of planetary motion and Copernicus's heliocentric model, of which Galileo was an advocate. Galileo claimed that the Solar System is not only made up of the Sun, the Moon and the planets but also comets. By observing movements around Jupiter, Galileo initially thought that these were the actions of stars. However, after a week of observing, he noticed changes in the patterns of motion in which he concluded that they are moons, four moons.

Shortly after, it was proved by Kepler himself that the Jupiter's moons move around the planet the same way planets orbit the Sun, thus making Kepler's laws universal.

== Enlightenment to Victorian Era ==
=== Newton's interpretation ===
After all these theories, people still did not know what made the planets orbit the Sun, nor why the Moon tracks the Earth. Until the 17th century when Isaac Newton introduced The Law of Universal Gravitation. He claimed that between any two masses, there is an attractive force between them proportional to the inverse of the distance squared.

$F = G \frac{m_1 m_2}{r^2}$

where m_{1} is the mass of the Sun and m_{2} is the mass of the planet, G is the gravitational constant and r is the distance between them. This theory was able to calculate the force on each planet by the Sun, which consequently, explained the planets elliptical motion.

The term "Solar System" entered the English language by 1704, when John Locke used it to refer to the Sun, planets, and comets as a whole. By then it had been established beyond doubt that planets are other worlds, and stars are other distant suns, so the whole Solar System is actually only a small part of an immensely large universe, and definitively something distinct.

=== Derived measurements ===
In 1672 Jean Richer and Giovanni Domenico Cassini measure the astronomical unit (AU), the mean distance Earth-Sun, to be about 138,370,000 km, (later refined by others up to the current value of 149,597,870 km). This gave for first time ever a well estimated size of the then known Solar System (that is, up to Saturn), following the scale derived from Kepler's third law.

In 1798 Henry Cavendish accurately measures the gravitational constant in the laboratory, which allows the mass of the Earth to be derived through Newton's law of universal gravitation, and hence the masses of all bodies in the Solar System.

=== New members of the Solar System ===
Telescopic observations found new moons around Jupiter and Saturn, as well as an impressive ring system around the latter.

In 1705 Edmond Halley asserted that the comet of 1682 is periodical with a highly elongated elliptical orbit around the Sun, and predicts its return in 1757. Johann Palitzsch observed in 1758 the return of the comet that Halley had anticipated. The interference of Jupiter's orbit had slowed the return by 618 days. Parisian astronomer La Caille suggests it should be named "Halley's Comet". Comets became a popular target for astronomers, and were recognized as members of the Solar System.

In 1766 Johann Titius found a numeric progression for planetary distances, published in 1772 by Johann Bode, the so-called Titius-Bode rule.

When in 1781 William Herschel discovered a new planet, Uranus, it was found it lies at a distance beyond Saturn that approximately matches that predicted by the Titius-Bode rule.

That rule observed a gap between Mars and Jupiter void of any known planet. In 1801 Giuseppe Piazzi discovered Ceres, a body that filled the gap and was regarded as a new planet, and in 1802 Heinrich Wilhelm Olbers discovered Pallas, at roughly the same distance to the Sun than Ceres. He proposed that the two objects were the remnants of a destroyed planet, and predicted that more of these pieces would be found. Due their star-like apparience, William Herschel suggested Ceres and Pallas, and similar objects if found, be placed into a separate category, named asteroids, although they were still counted among the planets for some decades. In 1804 Karl Ludwig Harding discovered the asteroid Juno, and in 1807 Olbers discovered the asteroid Vesta. In 1845 Karl Ludwig Hencke discovered a fifth body between Mars and Jupiter, Astraea, and in 1849 Annibale de Gasparis discovers the asteroid Hygiea, the fourth largest asteroid in the Solar System by both volume and mass. As new objects of that kind were found there at an accelerating rate, counting them among the planets became increasingly cumbersome. Eventually, they were dropped from the planet list (as first suggested by Alexander von Humboldt in the early 1850s) and Herschel's coinage, "asteroids", gradually came into common use. Since then, the region they occupy between Mars and Jupiter is known as the asteroid belt.

Alexis Bouvard detected irregularities in the orbit of Uranus in 1821. Later, between 1845 and 1846, John Adams and Urbain Le Verrier separately predicted the existence and location of a new planet from irregularities in the orbit of Uranus. This new planet was finally found by Johann Galle and eventually named Neptune, following the predicted position gave to him by Le Verrier. This fact marked the climax of the Newtonian mechanics applied to astronomy, but the Neptune's orbit does not fit with the Titius-Bode rule, so it has been deprecated from then on.

Eventually, new moons were discovered also around Uranus starting in 1787 by Herschel, around Neptune starting in 1846 by William Lassell and around Mars in 1877 by Asaph Hall.

== 20th century add-ons ==
In 1919 Arthur Stanley Eddington uses a solar eclipse to successfully test Albert Einstein's General Theory of Relativity, which in turn explains the observed irregularities in the orbital motion of Mercury, and disproves the existence of the hypothesized inner planet Vulcan.

General Theory of Relativity supersedes Newton's celestial mechanics. Instead of forces of attraction, gravity is seen as a bend of the tissue of the continuum space-time produced by the bodies' masses.

Clyde Tombaugh discovered Pluto in February 1930. It was regarded for decades as the ninth planet of the Solar System, until being declassified as a dwarf planet in August 2006. In June 1978 James Christy discovers Charon, the largest moon of Pluto.

In 1950 Jan Oort suggested the presence of a cometary reservoir in the outer limits of the Solar System, the Oort cloud, and in 1951 Gerard Kuiper argued for an annular reservoir of comets between 40 and 100 astronomical units from the Sun having formed early in the Solar System's evolution, but he did not think that such a belt still existed today. Decades later, this region was named after him, the Kuiper belt.

New asteroid populations were discovered, as Trojans since 1906 by Max Wolf, and Centaurs since 1977 by Charles Kowal, among many other.

From 1957 on, technology allowed for direct space exploration of the Solar System's bodies. To date, all their known main bodies have been visited at least once by robotic spacecraft, providing firsthand scientific data and closeup imaging. In some instances, robotic probes and rovers have landed on satellites, planets, asteroids and comets. And even some samples have been returned.

== Current model ==
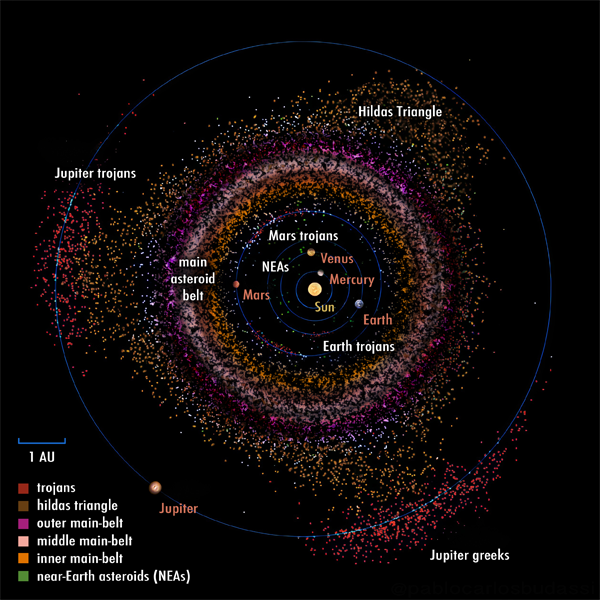
Overview of the Inner Solar System up to the Jovian System.

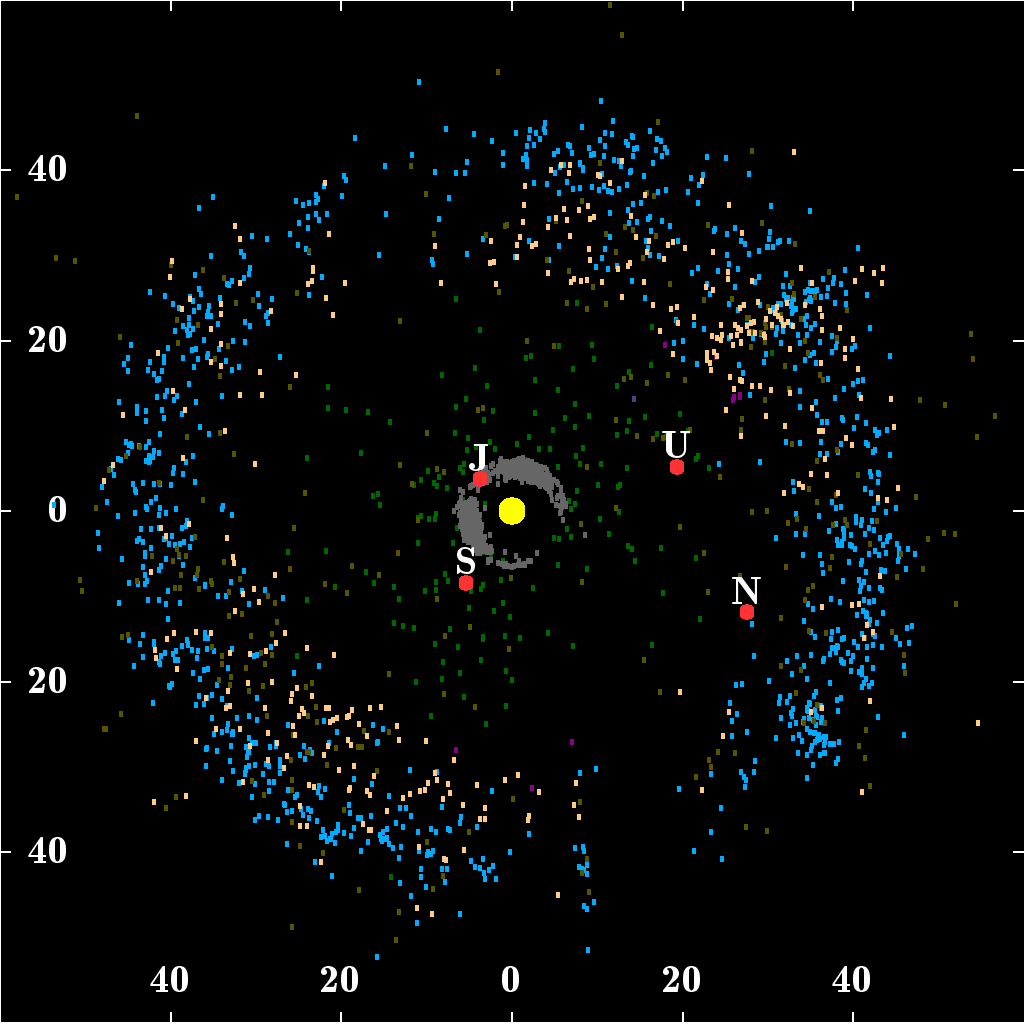
Plot of objects around the Kuiper belt and other asteroid populations, the J, S, U and N denotes Jupiter, Saturn, Uranus and Neptune.

The presumed distance of the Oort cloud compared to the rest of the Solar System.

The Sun is a lone, G-type main-sequence star inside the galaxy of the Milky Way, surrounded by eight major planets orbiting the star by the influence of gravity, most of them with a cohort of satellites, or moons, orbiting them. The biggest planets also have rings, consisting of a multitude of tiny solid objects and dust.

The planets are, in order of distance from the Sun: Mercury, Venus, Earth, Mars, Jupiter, Saturn, Uranus and Neptune.

There are three main belts of minor bodies:

- The asteroid belt, between Mars and Jupiter.
- The Kuiper belt beyond Neptune, followed by the scattered disc.
- The Oort cloud in the boundaries of the Solar System.

The biggest of these minor bodies are regarded as dwarf planets: Ceres in the asteroid belt, and Pluto, Eris, Haumea, Makemake, Gonggong, Quaoar, Sedna, and Orcus (along with other candidates) in the Kuiper belt.

== See also ==
- Discovery and exploration of the Solar System
- Timeline of Solar System astronomy
- Timeline of Solar System exploration
- History of astronomy
- Timeline of astronomy
- Fixed stars
- Dynamics of the celestial spheres
