= Concentric spheres =

Ancient Greek geocentric cosmological model

The cosmological model of concentric (or homocentric) spheres, developed by Eudoxus, Callippus, and Aristotle, employed celestial spheres all centered on the Earth. In this respect, it differed from the epicyclic and eccentric models with multiple centers, which were used by Ptolemy and other mathematical astronomers until the time of Copernicus.

== Origins of the concept of concentric spheres ==
Animation depicting Eudoxus' model of retrograde planetary motion. The two innermost homocentric spheres of his model are represented as rings here, each turning with the same period but in opposite directions, moving the planet along a figure-eight, or hippopede.

Eudoxus of Cnidus was the first astronomer to develop the concept of concentric spheres. He was originally a student at Plato's academy and is believed to have been influenced by the cosmological speculations of Plato and Pythagoras. He came up with the idea of homocentric spheres in order to explain the perceived inconsistent motions of the planets and to develop a uniform model for accurately calculating the movement of celestial objects. None of his books have survived to the modern day and everything we know about his cosmological theories comes from the works of Aristotle and Simplicius. According to these works, Eudoxus’ model had twenty-seven homocentric spheres with each sphere explaining a type of observable motion for each celestial object. Eudoxus assigns one sphere for the fixed stars which is supposed to explain their daily movement. He assigns three spheres to both the sun and the moon with the first sphere moving in the same manner as the sphere of the fixed stars. The second sphere explains the movement of the sun and the moon on the ecliptic plane. The third sphere was supposed to move on a “latitudinally inclined” circle and explain the latitudinal motion of the sun and the moon in the cosmos. Four spheres were assigned to Mercury, Venus, Mars, Jupiter, and Saturn which were the only known planets at that time. The first and second spheres of the planets moved exactly like the first two spheres of the sun and the moon. According to Simplicius, the third and fourth sphere of the planets were supposed to move in a way that created a curve known as a hippopede. The hippopede was a way to try to explain the retrograde motions of planets. Many historians of science, such as Michael J. Crowe, have argued that Eudoxus did not consider his system of concentric spheres to be a real representation of the universe but thought it was merely a mathematical model for calculating planetary motion.

== Later additions to Eudoxus' model ==
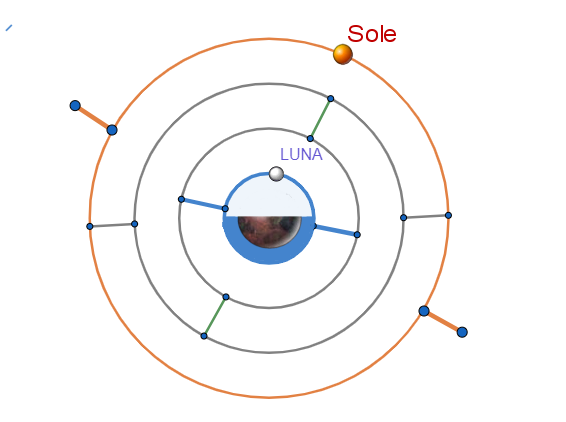
Schematic model likely representing the first 4, out of a total of 27, spheres of Eudoxus' cosmic model following Giovanni Schiaparell. Each sphere has its own rotational axis that, together, generates a complex motion for the planet, in this illustration, the moon.

Callippus, a contemporary of Eudoxus, attempted to improve his system by increasing the total number of homocentric spheres. He added two additional spheres for the sun and the moon as well as one additional sphere for Mars, Mercury, and Venus. These additional spheres were supposed to fix some of the calculation problems in Eudoxus’ original system. Callippus’ system was able to better predict the motions of certain celestial objects but his system still had many problems and was not able to account for many astronomical observations.

Aristotle developed his own system of concentric spheres in Metaphysics and De Caelo (On the Heavens). He thought that both Eudoxus and Callippus had too few spheres within their models and added more spheres onto Callippus’ system. He added three spheres to Jupiter and Mars as well as four spheres to Venus, Mercury, the sun, and the moon for a total of fifty-five spheres. He later doubted the accuracy of his results and stated that he believed there were either forty seven or forty nine concentric spheres. Historians are unsure about how many spheres Aristotle thought there were in the cosmos with theories ranging from 43 to 55. Unlike Eudoxus, Aristotle believed that his system represented an actual model of the cosmos.

== See also ==
- Celestial spheres
- Geocentric model
- Historical models of the Solar System
