= Copernican Revolution =

Radical shift in Western cosmology

- 1543–
- Ptolemaic astronomy
- Celestial spheres
- Heliocentrism
- Infinite universe
- Copernican principle
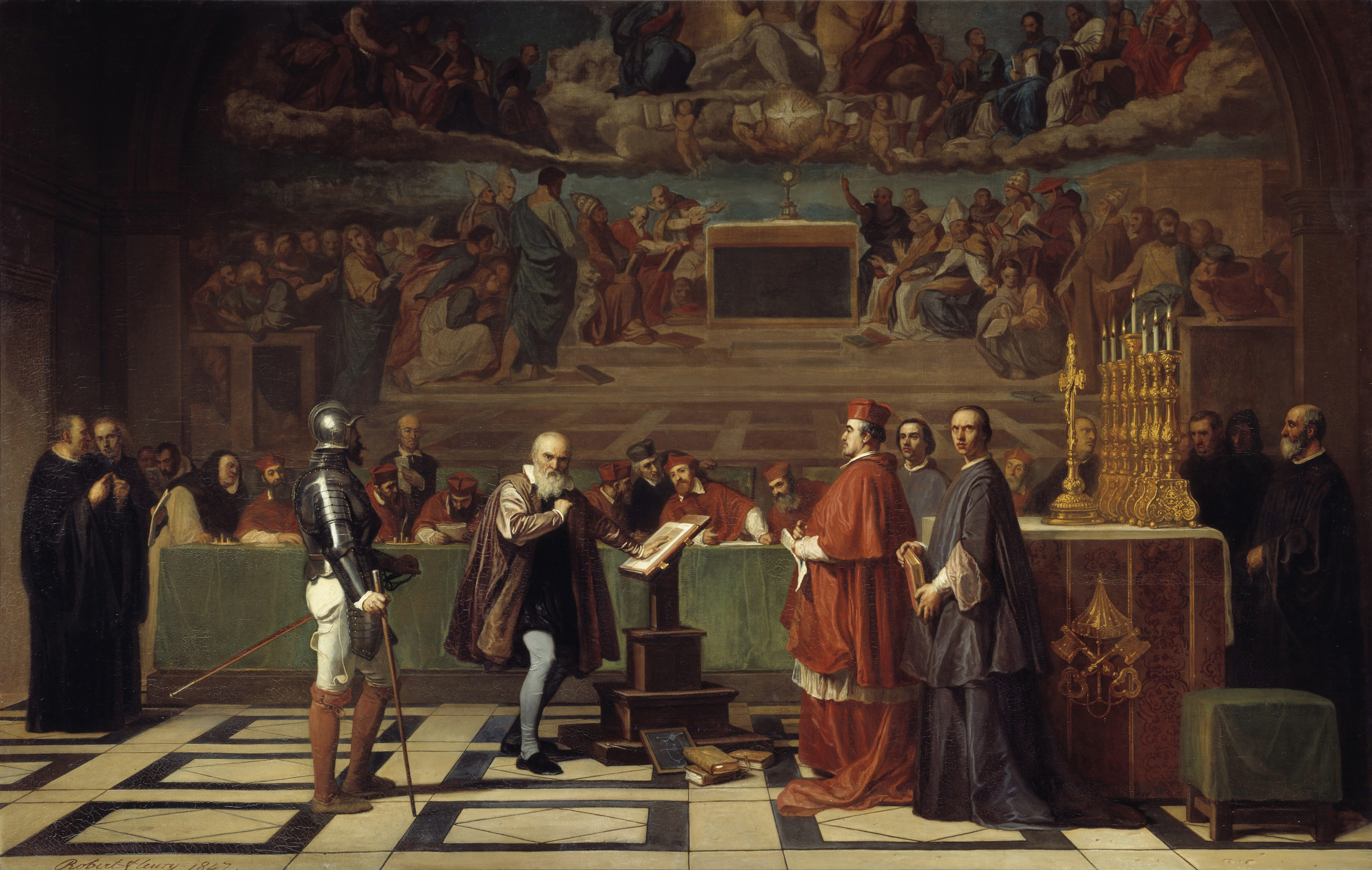
- Galileo before the Holy Office, a 19th-century painting by Joseph-Nicolas Robert-Fleury
- Location: Early modern Europe
- Leader(s): Proponents: Nicolaus Copernicus, Thomas Digges, Tycho Brahe, Johannes Kepler, Galileo Galilei, John Wilkins, Pierre Gassendi, Isaac Newton; Opponents: Martin Luther, Philip Melanchthon, Tommaso Caccini, Pope Paul V, Cardinal Bellarmine, Pope Urban VIII, Vincenzo Maculani, Giovanni Battista Riccioli, Pope Alexander VII
- Key events: De revolutionibus orbium coelestium; Gregorian calendar; Astronomia nova; Starry Messenger; Galileo observes phases of Venus; Letters on Sunspots; Letter to Benedetto Castelli; Galileo affair; Philosophiæ Naturalis Principia Mathematica; De revolutionibus removed from Index of Forbidden Books

Copernican Revolution is a phrase with different meanings in different contexts. In astronomy, the phrase refers to the transition from geocentrism to heliocentrism. For Christianity and Western culture, it may instead refer to the dismantling of the human-centric medieval cosmology and its cultural consequences. In physical cosmology, the phrase may be used to refer to the emergence and formalization of the Copernican principle that humans are not privileged observers of the universe. Within the philosophy of science, the Copernican Revolution is the first historic example of a paradigm shift in science. Finally, the phrase is sometimes used by English speakers as a metaphor for any radical intellectual upheaval that fundamentally reorders or reshapes our understanding of the world.

The Copernican Revolution is named for the Renaissance astronomer Nicolaus Copernicus, who in the 16th century proposed that the Earth revolves around the Sun. Driven by a desire for a more perfect (i.e. circular) description of the cosmos than the prevailing Ptolemaic model — which posited that the Sun circled a stationary Earth — Copernicus instead advanced a heliostatic model where a stationary Sun was located near, though not precisely at, the center of the heavens.

== Heliocentrism ==
=== Almagest ===
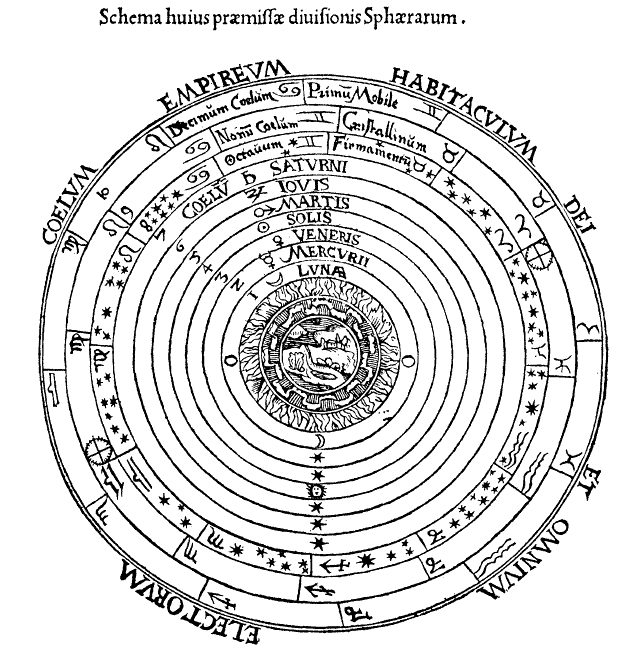
16th-century representation of Ptolemy's geocentric model in Peter Apian's Cosmographia, 1524

The idea of heliocentrism — a Sun-centered Universe — can be traced back to Aristarchus of Samos, a Hellenistic author writing in the 3rd century BC, who may in turn have been drawing on even older concepts in Pythagoreanism. Ancient heliocentrism was, however, eclipsed by the geocentric model presented by Ptolemy in the Almagest (c. AD 150) and accepted in Aristotelianism.

Andalusian philosopher Averroes’ criticism of Ptolemy in the 13th century sparked a debate among European scholars. That debate was revived by the recovery of Ptolemy's text and its translation into Latin in the mid-15th century. (Note: "Averroes' criticism of Ptolemaic astronomy precipitated this debate in Europe. [...] The recovery of Ptolemy's texts and their translation from Greek into Latin in the middle of the fifteenth century stimulated further consideration of these issues.") The mathematician and science historian Otto E. Neugebauer argues that the debate in 15th-century Latin scholarship must also have been influenced by the criticism of Ptolemy that was produced, after Averroes, in the Ilkhanid-era (13th to 14th centuries) Persian school of astronomy associated with the Maragheh observatory (especially the works of Al-Urdi, Al-Tusi and Ibn al-Shatir).

Copernicus learned about Ptolemy's model when he was a university student through Theoricae novae planetarum by Georg von Peuerbach, compiled from lecture notes by Peuerbach's student Regiomontanus and printed in 1472. Regiomontanus himself was the teacher of Domenico Maria Novara da Ferrara, who was in turn the teacher of Copernicus.

=== Purging the Equant ===
Motion of the Sun (yellow), Earth (blue), and Mars (red). At left, Copernicus's heliocentric motion. At right, traditional geocentric motion, including the retrograde motion of Mars. For simplicity, Mars's period of revolution is depicted as 2 years instead of 1.88, and orbits are depicted as perfectly circular or epitrochoid.

Copernicus studied at Bologna University during 1496–1501, where he became the assistant of Domenico Maria Novara da Ferrara. He is known to have studied the Epitome in Almagestum Ptolemei by Peuerbach and Regiomontanus (printed in Venice in 1496) and to have performed observations of lunar motions on 9 March 1497. In De revolutionibus orbium coelestium, published in 1543, Copernicus attempted to align his work as closely as possible with Ptolemaic tradition. A comparison of his work with the Almagest shows that he followed Ptolemy's methods and even his order of presentation. Yet, in order to purge astronomy of the equant — which violated the philosophical ideal that all celestial motion must be perfect and uniform — Copernicus challenged Ptolemy's geocentrism, an orthodoxy that had prevailed for over a millennium. Copernicus' heliostatic model (with a stationary Sun located near, though not precisely at, the mathematical center of the heavens) retained several false Ptolemaic assumptions such as the planets' circular orbits, epicycles, and uniform speeds, but also included accurate ideas such as:

- The Earth is one of several planets revolving around the Sun in a determined order.
- The Earth rotates daily on its axis and revolves annually about the Sun.
- Retrograde motion of the planets is explained by the Earth's motion.
- The distance from the Earth to the Sun is small compared to the distance from the Sun to the stars.

In The Sleepwalkers, the author and journalist Arthur Koestler writes that De revolutionibus orbium coelestium "was and is an all-time worst-seller." Discovering a first edition of De revolutionibus that had been extensively annotated by the leading teacher of astronomy in Europe in the 1540s — which seemed to contradict Koestler — the astronomer and science historian Owen Gingerich spent three decades tracking down and personally examining all existing first and second editions of Copernicus' major work. He established not only that De revolutionibus was widely read by 16th century astronomers but also what they thought of it:

Reinhold and his many followers admired Copernicus for a quite different aesthetic idea, the elimination of the equant. Copernicus devoted the great majority of De revolutionibus to showing how this could be done. While he had eliminated all of Ptolemy's major epicycles, merging them all into the Earth's orbit, he then introduced a series of little epicycles to replace the equant, one per planet. Because this made the motion uniform in each Copernican circle, the anti-equant aesthetic was satisfied. My Copernican census eventually helped to establish that the majority of sixteenth-century astronomers thought eliminating the equant was Copernicus' big achievement, because it satisfied the ancient aesthetic principle that eternal celestial motions should be uniform and circular or compounded of uniform and circular parts.

Copernicus' challenge reached 16th-century astronomers but failed to displace the dominance of Ptolemy's geocentrism, which only fell out of favor among astronomers after Galileo's telescopic observations of 1610. But Copernicanism did gain a handful of supporters in the 16th century. Thomas Digges and Giordano Bruno used Copernicus' new estimate of the distance to the stars to argue for an indefinitely extended or even infinite universe in opposition to the ancient orthodoxy of celestial spheres. William Gilbert also argued (correctly) that Copernicus was right about the Earth rotating on its axis (instead of an outer "shell" of rotating stars) while also arguing (incorrectly) that the mechanism of the Earth's rotation is magnetism.

The science historians A. Rupert Hall, Herbert Butterfield, Arthur Koestler, Otto Neugebauer and David Wootton all emphasize that, from a strictly scientific point-of-view, Copernicus' work should not be considered revolutionary.

=== Protestant Attacks ===
Copernicus was a canon, a lifelong official of the Catholic Church. Even before his death in 1543 and during the following 70 years (until 1610), his model faced withering criticism from Protestant leaders who were locked in combat with the Church, were often animated by a fierce anti-clericalism and typically adopted a literalist approach to Scripture. Protestant leaders Martin Luther and Philip Melanchthon both attacked Copernicus. Luther famously cited the Book of Joshua to prove the sun moves and reportedly called Copernicus a "fool." His colleague Melanchthon urged governments to repress the "absurd" theory. Meanwhile, the Catholic Church indirectly used Copernican mathematics in its reform of the Gregorian calendar in 1582 and otherwise, until 1610, remained officially silent on either the merits or demerits of Copernicanism.

=== Telescope ===
In 1610 Galileo Galilei observed with his telescope that Venus showed phases, despite remaining near the Sun in Earth's sky (first image), which was strong evidence that the geocentric model (second image) was false.

Galileo Galilei, sometimes referred to as the "father of modern observational astronomy," developed his own telescope with enough magnification to allow him to study Venus and discover that it has phases like a moon. His improvements to the telescope, astronomical observations, and support for Copernicanism were all integral to the Copernican Revolution.

Based on the designs of spectacle-maker Hans Lippershey, Galileo designed his own telescope which, in the following year, he had improved to 30× magnification. Using this new instrument, Galileo made a number of astronomical observations which he published in the Sidereus Nuncius in 1610. In this book, he described the surface of the Moon as rough, uneven, and imperfect. He also noted that "the boundary dividing the bright from the dark part does not form a uniformly oval line, as would happen in a perfectly spherical solid, but is marked by an uneven, rough, and very sinuous line, as the figure shows." These observations challenged Aristotle's claim that the Moon was a perfect sphere and the larger idea that the heavens were perfect and unchanging.

Galileo's next astronomical discovery would prove to be a surprising one. While observing Jupiter over the course of several days, he noticed four stars close to Jupiter whose positions were changing in a way that would be impossible if they were fixed stars. After much observation, he concluded these four stars were orbiting the planet Jupiter and were in fact moons, not stars. This was a radical discovery because, according to Aristotelian cosmology, all heavenly bodies revolve around the Earth and a planet with moons obviously contradicted that popular belief. While contradicting Aristotelian belief, it supported Copernican cosmology which stated that Earth is a planet like all others.

In 1610, Galileo observed that Venus had a full set of phases, similar to the phases of the moon we can observe from Earth. This was explainable by the Copernican or Tychonic systems which said that all phases of Venus would be visible due to the nature of its orbit around the Sun, unlike the Ptolemaic system which stated only some of Venus's phases would be visible. Due to Galileo's observations of Venus, Ptolemy's system became highly suspect and the majority of leading astronomers subsequently converted to various heliocentric models, making his discovery one of the most influential in the transition from geocentrism to heliocentrism.

=== Trials of Galileo ===
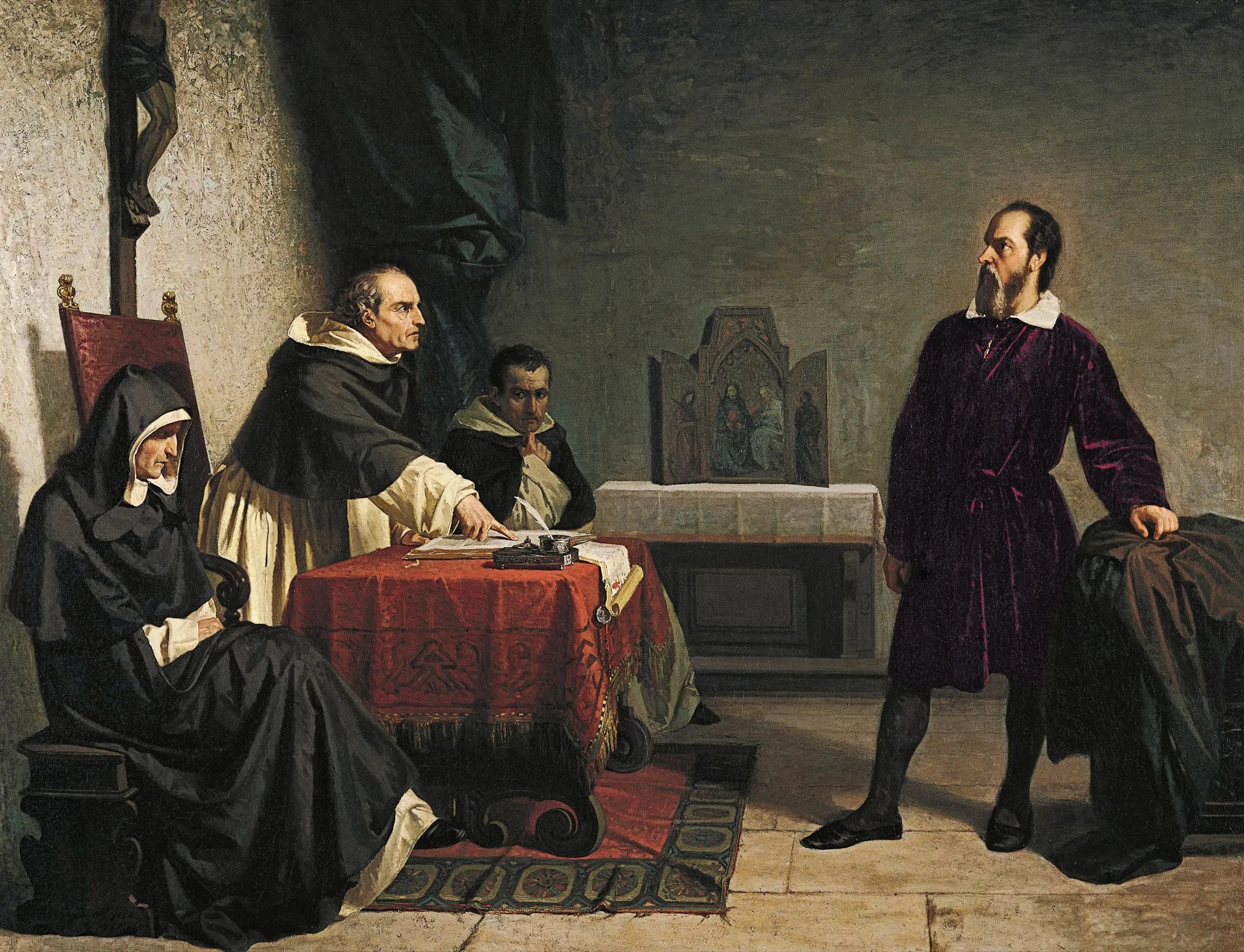
Cristiano Banti's 1857 painting Galileo facing the Roman Inquisition

Galileo's Letters on Sunspots, published in 1613, defended the view that sunspots are features of the Sun's surface but also reported his 1610 telescopic observations of the full set of phases of Venus. In his 1615 Letter to the Grand Duchess Christina, Galileo argued that the language of the Bible had been accommodated to be understandable to uneducated people and should therefore not be interpreted as literal scientific descriptions and the Catholic Church risked reputational damage in the long run if it officially condemned heliocentrism.

Galileo received staunch support from a Carmelite friar, Paolo Antonio Foscarini, who published a book defending Galileo's work and presenting it as compatible with the Bible, but also bitter opposition from some philosophers and clerics, two of whom denounced him to the Roman Inquisition early in 1615, warning "that Galileo should not go outside mathematics and physics and should avoid provoking theologians by teaching them how to read the Bible". The Dominican friar and preacher Tommaso Caccini both issued a complaint to the Inquisition and also attacked Galileo in sermons, ordering him to withdraw from philosophy and citing Acts 1:11: "Ye men of Galilee, why stand ye gazing up into heaven?".

The report of the Inquisition's consultants declared heliocentrism as "false and contrary to Scripture" in February 1616. The Church demanded Galileo stop teaching and defending Copernican theory, to which Galileo agreed. In March, the Church's Congregation of the Index issued a decree suspending De revolutionibus until it could be "corrected." The edits to De revolutionibus, which omitted or altered nine sentences, were issued four years later, in 1620.

A second trial in 1633 led to Galileo's house arrest and a ban on his books.

== Profane universe ==
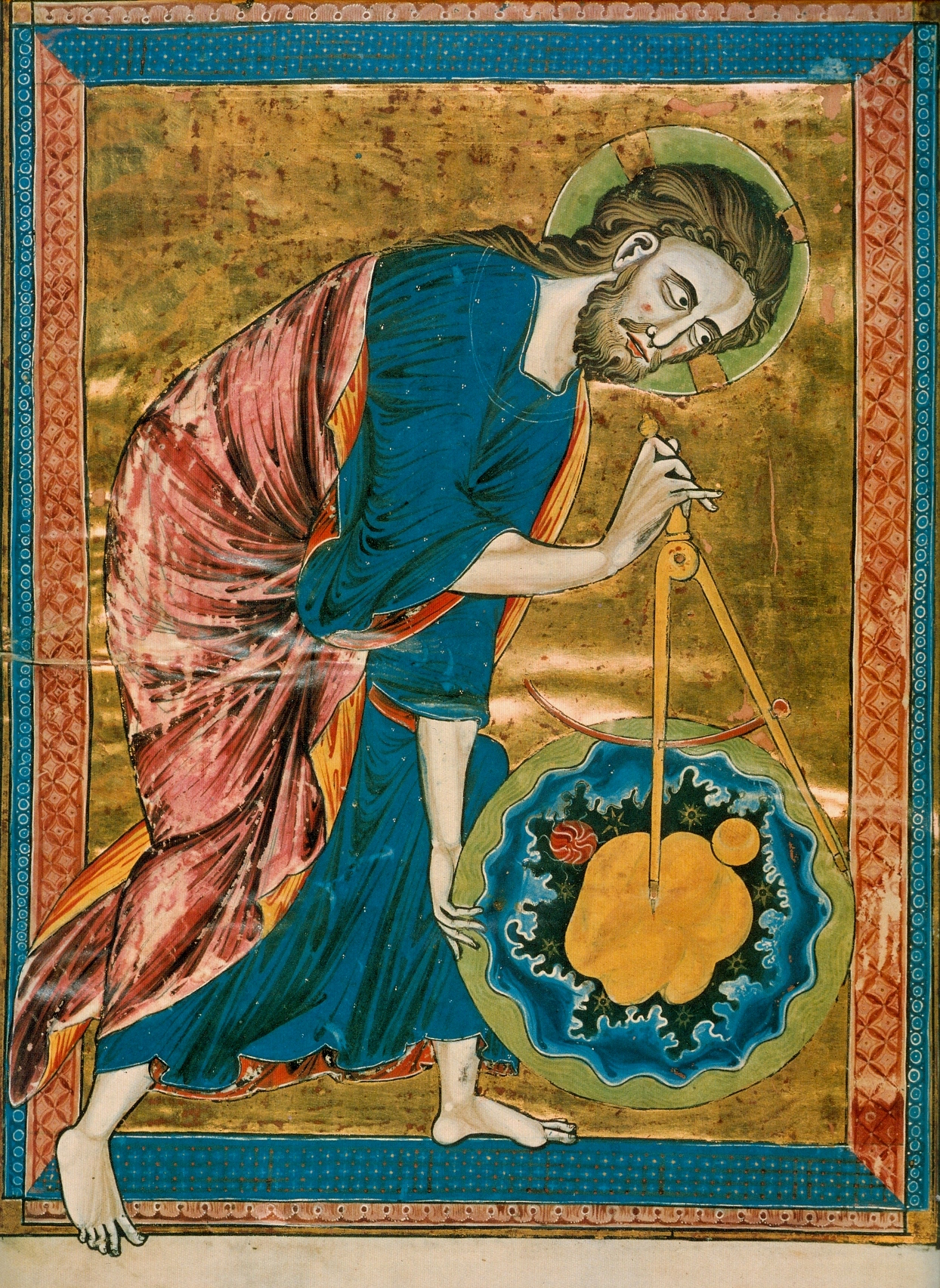
God, depicted as the Great Architect of the Universe, creating the Universe using geometric and harmonic principles. Many Christians have believed that to seek to understand these principles was to seek and worship God. c. 1250

"In its extrascientific consequences," writes historian and philosopher of science Thomas Kuhn, "the Copernican theory is not typical: few scientific theories have played such a large role in non-scientific thought." The Copernican Revolution began as a narrowly technical revision of classical astronomy but ended by altering the West's relation to both the Universe and God. By reimagining the Earth not as the unique and focal center of God’s creation and attention but instead as just an unremarkable planet, circulating purposelessly around an ordinary star, no different from an uncountable number of others, the Revolution became an enormous cultural upheaval that shattered the long-standing synthesis of Aristotelian physics and Christian theology. A Universe where the physical location of human beings had easily understood spiritual significance gave way to a cosmic scheme where human existence appeared neither unique nor privileged.

The end of the human-centered cosmos was eventually part of a complete replacement of a finite and qualitative world by an infinite and quantitative one. That replacement appeared to leave human beings alone in a silent, infinite universe where existence was no longer a reflection of divine values but merely a neutral fact of mathematics. The science historian Alexandre Koyré describes this unintended outcome — the stripping of hierarchical order, purpose and meaning from the universe — as the "utter devalorization of being." Stripping away the religious logic that had undergirded Western culture up to Copernicus, the Revolution forced a significant fraction of humanity to find alternative sources for identity and meaning, a transition which is arguably still ongoing.

== Copernican principle ==
In physical cosmology, the Copernican principle states that humans are not privileged observers of the universe. Named after Copernicus by the 20th-century mathematician and cosmologist Hermann Bondi, the principle posits that observations made from Earth are representative of those made from any average position in the universe.

Most modern cosmology is based on the assumption that the cosmological principle is almost, but not exactly, true on the largest scales. The Copernican principle represents the irreducible philosophical assumption needed to justify this, when combined with the observations. If one assumes the Copernican principle and observes that the universe appears isotropic or the same in all directions from the vantage point of Earth, then one can infer that the universe is generally homogeneous or the same everywhere (at any given time) and is also isotropic about any given point. These two conditions then justify the cosmological principle.

The Copernican principle has never been proven, and in the most general sense cannot be proven, but it is implicit in many modern theories of physics. Cosmological models are often derived with reference to the cosmological principle, slightly more general than the Copernican principle, and many tests of these models can be considered tests of the Copernican principle.

== Paradigm shift in science ==
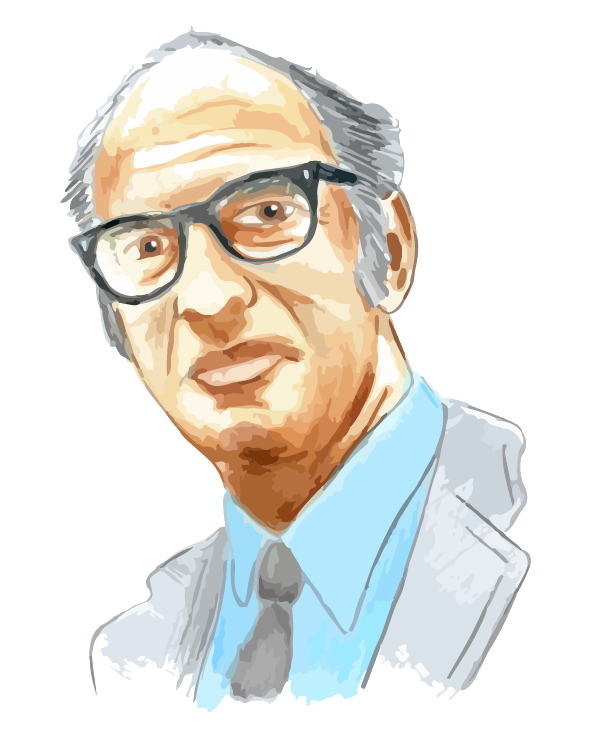
Thomas Kuhn is credited with coining the term "paradigm shift" to describe the creation and evolution of scientific theories.

A "paradigm shift" is a concept in the philosophy of science that was originally introduced by Thomas Kuhn in The Structure of Scientific Revolutions. Kuhn characterized the Copernican Revolution as the first historical example of a paradigm shift:

"Probably the single most prevalent claim advanced by the proponents of a new paradigm shift is that they can solve the problems that have led the old one into crisis...Claims of this sort are particularly likely to succeed if the new paradigm displays a quantitative precision strikingly better than its older competitor. The quantitative superiority of Kepler's Rudolphine Tables to all those computed from the Ptolemaic theory was a major factor in the conversion of astronomers to Copernicanism...[Further] particularly persuasive arguments can be developed if the new paradigm permits the prediction of phenomena that had been entirely unsuspected ... Copernicus' theory, for example, suggested that planets should be like the earth, that Venus should show phases, and that the universe must be vastly larger than had previously been supposed. As a result, when sixty years after his death the telescope suddenly displayed mountains on the moon, the phases of Venus, and an immense number of previously unsuspected stars, those observations brought the new theory a great many converts, particularly among non-astronomers."

Kuhn acknowledged that Copernicus' work De revolutionibus was not itself revolutionary:

"...measured in terms of its consequences, De Revolutionibus is a relatively staid, sober, and unrevolutionary work. Most of the essential elements by which we know the Copernican Revolution - easy and accurate computations of planetary position, the abolition of epicycles and eccentrics, the dissolution of the spheres, the sun a star, the infinite expansion of the universe - these and many others are not to be found anywhere in Copernicus' work. In every respect except the earth's motion the De Revolutionibus seems more closely akin to the works of ancient and medieval astronomers and cosmologists than to the writings of the succeeding generations who based their work upon Copernicus' and who made explicit the radical consequences that even its author had not seen in his work. The significance of De Revolutionibus lies, then, less in what it says itself than in what it caused others to say. The book gave rise to a revolution that it had scarcely enunciated. It is a revolution-making rather than a revolutionary text."

Decades after The Structure of Scientific Revolutions was published, Kuhn replaced the idea of paradigm shift with the idea that scientific language is a taxonomy and that a scientific revolution is essentially a restructuring of taxonomic categories. He adopted the model of the biological process of speciation to describe the birth of a new scientific specialty:

[R]evolutions, which produce new divisions between fields in scientific development, are much like episodes of speciation in biological evolution. The biological parallel to revolutionary change is not mutation, as I thought for many years, but speciation. And the problems presented by speciation (e.g., the difficulty in identifying an episode of speciation until some time after it has occurred, and the impossibility even then, of dating the time of its occurrence) are very similar to those presented by revolutionary change and by the emergence and individuation of new scientific specialties.

== Metaphorical usage ==
Immanuel Kant in his Critique of Pure Reason (1787 edition) drew a parallel between the Copernican hypothesis and the epistemology of his new transcendental philosophy. Kant's comparison is made in the Preface to the second edition of the Critique of Pure Reason (published in 1787; a heavy revision of the first edition of 1781). Kant argues that, just as Copernicus moved from the supposition of heavenly bodies revolving around a stationary spectator to a moving spectator, so metaphysics, "proceeding precisely on the lines of Copernicus' primary hypothesis", should move from assuming that "knowledge must conform to objects" to the supposition that "objects must conform to our [a priori] knowledge". (Note: In an English translation: "Hitherto it has been assumed that all our knowledge must conform to objects. But all attempts to extend our knowledge of objects by establishing something in regard to them a priori, by means of concepts, have, on this assumption, ended in failure. We must therefore make trial whether we may not have more success in the tasks of metaphysics, if we suppose that objects must conform to our knowledge. This would agree better with what is desired, namely, that it should be possible to have knowledge of objects a priori, determining something in regard to them prior to their being given. We should then be proceeding precisely on the lines of Copernicus's primary hypothesis. Failing of satisfactory progress in explaining the movements of the heavenly bodies on the supposition that they all revolved round the spectator, he tried whether he might not have better success if he made the spectator to revolve and the stars to remain at rest. A similar experiment can be tried in metaphysics, as regards the intuition of objects.") Scholars have argued that Kant's analogy is flawed, however, because it essentially reverses Copernicus' logic. Tom Rockmore also notes Kant himself never used the specific phrase.

I. Bernard Cohen in his book "Revolution in Science" has "Chapter 15 Kant's Alleged Copernican Revolution" about the "myth".

Following Kant, the phrase "Copernican Revolution" in the 20th century came to be used as a metaphor for intellectual upheaval.

== See also ==
- Science in the Renaissance
