= Scientific formalism =

Concept in philosophy of science

Scientific formalism is a family of approaches to the presentation of science. It is viewed as an important part of the scientific method, especially in the physical sciences.

== Levels of formalism ==
There are multiple levels of scientific formalism possible. At the lowest level, scientific formalism deals with the symbolic manner in which the information is presented. To achieve formalism in a scientific theory at this level, one starts with a well defined set of axioms, and from this follows a formal system.

However, at a higher level, scientific formalism also involves consideration of the axioms themselves. These can be viewed as questions of ontology. For example, one can, at the lower level of formalism, define a property called 'existence'. However, at the higher level, the question of whether an electron exists in the same sense that a bacterium exists still needs to be resolved.

Some actual formal theories on facts have been proposed.

== In modern physics ==
The scientific climate of the twentieth century revived these questions. From about the time of Isaac Newton to that of James Clerk Maxwell they had been dormant, in the sense that the physical sciences could rely on the status of the real numbers as a description of the continuum, and an agnostic view of atoms and their structure. Quantum mechanics, the dominant physical theory after about 1925, was formulated in a way which raised questions of both types.

In the Newtonian framework there was indeed a degree of comfort in the answers one could give. Consider for example the question of whether the Earth really goes round the Sun. In a frame of reference adapted to calculating the Earth's orbit, this is a mathematical but also tautological statement. Newtonian mechanics can answer the question, whether it is not equally the case that the Sun goes round the Earth, as it indeed appears to Earth-based astronomers. In Newton's theory there is a basic, fixed frame of reference that is inertial. The 'correct answer' is that the point of view of an observer in an inertial frame of reference is privileged: other observers see artifacts of their acceleration relative to an inertial frame (the inertial forces). Before Newton, Galileo would draw the consequences, from the Copernican heliocentric model. He was, however, constrained to call his work (in effect) scientific formalism, under the old 'description' saving the phenomena. To avoid going against authority, the elliptic orbits of the heliocentric model could be labelled as a more convenient device for calculations, rather than an actual description of reality.

In general relativity, Newton's inertial frames are no longer privileged. In quantum mechanics, Paul Dirac argued that physical models were not there to provide semantic constructs allowing us to understand microscopic physics in language comparable to that we use on the familiar scale of everyday objects. His attitude, adopted by many theoretical physicists, is that a good model is judged by our capacity to use it to calculate physical quantities that can be tested experimentally. Dirac's view is close to what Bas van Fraassen calls constructive empiricism.

== Duhem ==
A physicist who took the issues involved seriously was Pierre Duhem, writing at the beginning of the twentieth century. He wrote an extended analysis of the approach he saw as characteristically British, in requiring field theories of theoretical physics to have a mechanical-physical interpretation. That was an accurate characterisation of what Dirac (himself British) would later argue against. The national characteristics specified by Duhem do not need to be taken too seriously, since he also claimed that the use of abstract algebra, namely quaternions, was also characteristically British (as opposed to French or German); as if the use of classical analysis methods alone was important one way or the other.

Duhem also wrote on saving the phenomena. In addition to the Copernican Revolution debate of "saving the phenomena" (Greek: σῴζειν τὰ φαινόμενα, sozein ta phainomena) versus offering explanations that inspired Duhem was Thomas Aquinas, who wrote, regarding eccentrics and epicycles, that

Reason may be employed in two ways to establish a point: firstly, for the purpose of furnishing sufficient proof of some principle [...]. Reason is employed in another way, not as furnishing a sufficient proof of a principle, but as confirming an already established principle, by showing the congruity of its results, as in astronomy the theory of eccentrics and epicycles is considered as established, because thereby the sensible appearances of the heavenly movements can be explained (possunt salvari apparentia sensibilia); not, however, as if this proof were sufficient, forasmuch as some other theory might explain them. [...]

The idea that a physical interpretation—in common language or classical ideas and physical entities, though of or examined in an ontological or quasi-ontological sense—of a phenomenon in physics is not an ultimate or necessary condition for its understanding or validity, also appears in modern structural realist views on science.

== Bellarmine ==
Robert Bellarmine wrote to heliocentrist Paolo Antonio Foscarini:

Nor is it the same to demonstrate that by assuming the sun to be at the center and the earth in heaven one can save the appearances, and to demonstrate that in truth the sun is at the center and the earth in heaven; for I believe the first demonstration may be available, but I have very great doubts about the second…

Modern physicist Pierre Duhem "suggests that in one respect, at least, Bellarmine had shown himself a better scientist than Galileo by disallowing the possibility of a 'strict proof of the earth's motion,' on the grounds that an astronomical theory merely 'saves the appearances' without necessarily revealing what 'really happens.'"

== See also ==
- Andreas Osiander
- Scientific community metaphor
