= Astronomia nova =

Book by Johannes Kepler (1609)

Astronomia nova (English: New Astronomy)
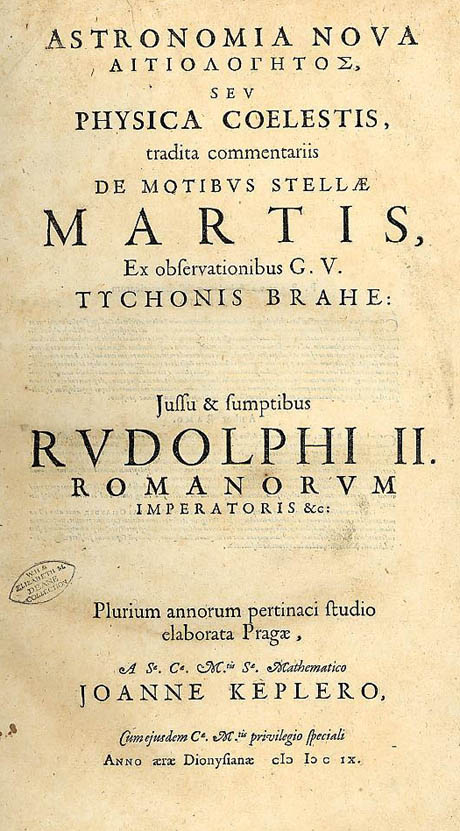
- Author: Johannes Kepler
- Original title: Astronomia Nova ΑΙΤΙΟΛΟΓΗΤΟΣ seu physica coelestis, tradita commentariis de motibus stellae Martis ex observationibus G.V. Tychonis Brahe (New Astronomy, reasoned from Causes, or Celestial Physics, Treated by Means of Commentaries on the Motions of the Star Mars, from the Observations of the noble Tycho Brahe)
- Language: Latin
- Subject: astronomy
- Publication date: 1609

Astronomia nova (English: New Astronomy, full title in original Latin: Astronomia Nova ΑΙΤΙΟΛΟΓΗΤΟΣ seu physica coelestis, tradita commentariis de motibus stellae Martis ex observationibus G.V. Tychonis Brahe) is a book, published in 1609, that contains the results of the astronomer Johannes Kepler's ten-year-long investigation of the motion of Mars.

One of the most significant books in the history of astronomy, the Astronomia nova provided strong arguments for heliocentrism and contributed valuable insight into the movement of the planets. This included the first mention of the planets' elliptical paths and the change of their movement to the movement of free floating bodies as opposed to objects on rotating spheres. It is recognized as one of the most important works of the Scientific Revolution.

== Background ==
Prior to Kepler, Nicolaus Copernicus proposed in 1543 that the Earth and other planets orbit the Sun. The Copernican model of the Solar System was regarded as a device to explain the observed positions of the planets rather than a physical description.

Kepler sought for and proposed physical causes for planetary motion. His work is primarily based on the research of his mentor, Tycho Brahe. The two, though close in their work, had a tumultuous relationship. Regardless, in 1601 on his deathbed, Brahe asked Kepler to make sure that he did not "die in vain," and to continue the development of his model of the Solar System. Kepler would instead write the Astronomia nova, in which he rejects the Tychonic system, as well as the Ptolemaic system and the Copernican system. Some scholars have speculated that Kepler's dislike for Brahe may have had a hand in his rejection of the Tychonic system and formation of a new one.

By 1602, Kepler set to work on determining the orbit pattern of Mars, keeping David Fabricius informed of his progress. He suggested the possibility of an oval orbit to Fabricius by early 1604, though was not believed. Later in the year, Kepler wrote back with his discovery of Mars's elliptical orbit. The manuscript for Astronomia nova was completed by September 1607, and was in print by August 1609.

== Structure and summary ==
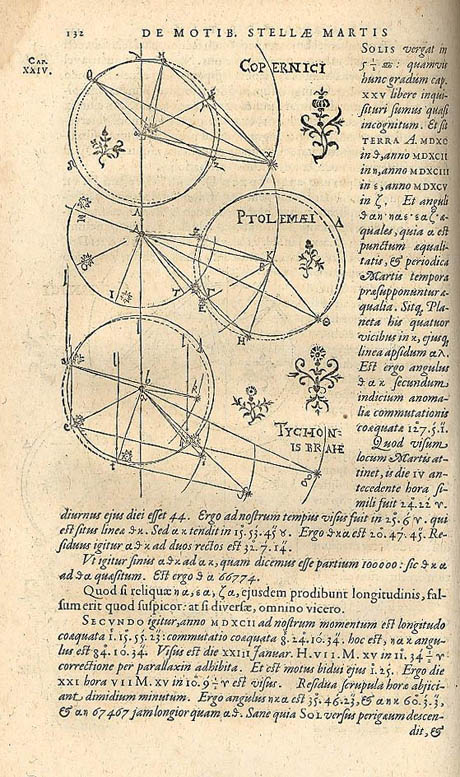
Diagrams of the three models of planetary motion prior to Kepler

In English, the full title of his work is the New Astronomy, Based upon Causes, or Celestial Physics, Treated by Means of Commentaries on the Motions of the Star Mars, from the Observations of Tycho Brahe, Gent. For over 650 pages (in the English translation), Kepler walks his readers, step by step, through his process of discovery. The work is divided into 5 parts, and contains a total of 70 chapters.

=== Part 1 ===
In the first part, Kepler examines the relationship between the various astronomical hypotheses that were in use at the time.

In chapters 1-3, He shows that the heliocentric, geocentric and Tychonic models are all mathematically equivalent in that they predict the same angular positions of celestial object, and the variation in distance for any planet are also the same in all three models. This is so because the epicycle in the geocentric model plays the same role as the orbit of the Earth in heliocentric model and the orbit of the sun in Tycho's model. But the motion of the planets is observed to be non-uniform, even if we ignore the effects of the epicycle or the Earth's motion. Ptolemy and Copernicus had two different explanations for this. Ptolemy used an equant and eccentric circle, whereas Copernicus realized that he could combine two epicycles to explain the same effect. Kepler showed, however, that Copernicus' explanation is simply equivalent to an equant point with a non-circular orbit. The difference in the predictions between the two explanations were minor and are for practical purposes equivalent.

In chapters 4-6, Kepler considers a more physically plausible explanation for the non-uniform motion. He considers that the speed of the planet varies inversely with its distance from the sun. This explanation is shown, by calculation, to be consistent with the predictions of the equant or Copernicus' epicycles. But it requires Kepler to assume that the line of apsides for all planets intersect at the sun, whereas Ptolemy and Copernicus had assumed this point to be the center of the orbit of the earth/sun, which was referred to as the mean sun. The difference between the predictions is minor but is amplified if the effect of the Earth's orbit is accounted for, in which case the difference could get as high as $1\circ$, which was certainly measurable.

=== Part 2 ===
In part 2, Kepler introduces the vicarious Hypothesis, his first hypothesis to explain the motion of Mars.

In chapters 7-10, Kepler tells the story of how he was introduced to the problem of Mars' orbit. Tycho and his assistant had been working on a theory of Mars, but they had failed to accurately account for the observed position of Mars. Tycho's observational data included 12 oppositions of Mars, for which he had determined its position in ecliptic longitude and latitude. They had managed to fit a theory to the observed ecliptic longitudes accurate to within 2 minutes of arc, yet it failed completely to account for the ecliptic latitudes. Kepler was then tasked with determining a more accurate theory to match this observational data.

His first step was to establish a precise definition of opposition. Since planets do not orbit in the same plane, in general they never reach precisely $180\circ$ in angular separation. Ptolemy had assumed the planet reaches opposition when its ecliptic longitude is 180 degrees from the mean position of the sun. This definition ignores the ecliptic latitude, so when constructing the table of oppositions, Tycho's assistant suggested a correction to account for this, by instead measuring when the angle between the sun and one of the nodes along the ecliptic, was equal to the angle between planet and the opposite node measured along the path of the planet. But Kepler showed this correction to be erroneous for two reasons. First, the path of the planet as seen from the Earth is not the same as seen from the sun, and second, the ecliptic longitude of Mars as seen from the sun will not be the same as the ecliptic longitude of the Earth. The whole point of using oppositions is to eliminate the effect of the Earth's orbit, so that when we observe Mars from Earth, its position will be the same as if we observed it from the sun. So this error, which Kepler shows to be as high as 9 arcminutes, defeats the purpose of the correction.

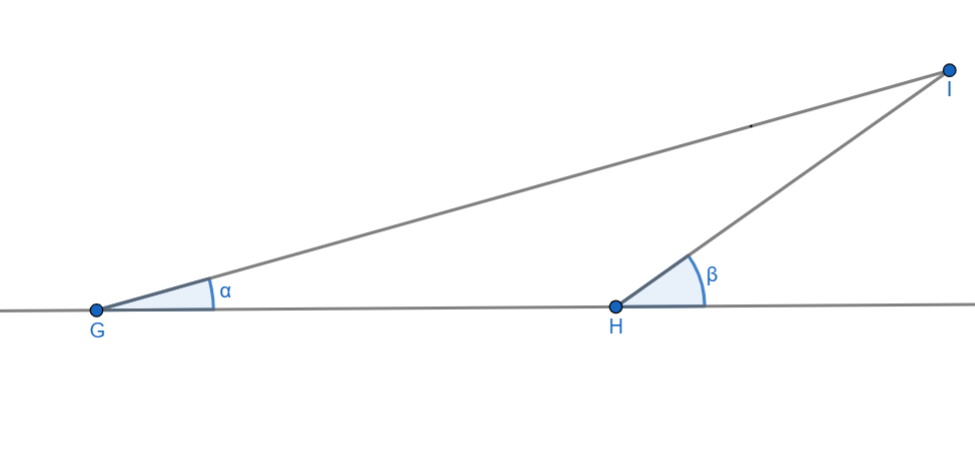

The actual correction Kepler shows to be less than 1 minute of arc, which is smaller than the error in Tycho's observations, and for practical purposes can be ignored. So, opposition can be defined as the moment when the ecliptic longitude of the sun and Mars are $180\circ$ apart. Although the ecliptic longitude of Mars is the same from the Earth and sun at this point, the same is not true for the ecliptic latitude. In the diagram above $G$ is the sun, $H$ is the Earth and $I$ is Mars. The line $GH$ is in the plane of the ecliptic. The angle $\beta$ is the angle that Mars appears above the ecliptic when viewed from Earth; this is the ecliptic latitude. The angle $\alpha$ is the ecliptic latitude viewed from the sun, which is smaller than $\beta$. The relation between these angles tells us something about the ratio of the Earth-sun distance $GH$ and the Mars-Sun distance $GI$.

In chapter 11, Kepler attempts to determine the parallax of Mars. As Mars is close to the Earth, its position in the sky will appear to change slightly as the observer's position changes throughout the day, even if it is otherwise stationary. This effect, called parallax, would be greatest when Mars is at opposition, since at that time Mars is at its closest point to the Earth. The existing estimates of the distance to the sun, based largely on Aristarchus' method, suggested the parallax could be as high as 6 minutes of arc, but Kepler's own attempts to determine parallax gave values that were less than 2 arc minutes.

In chapters 12-14, Kepler determines the longitude of Mars' ascending and descending nodes and the orbital inclination of Mars. To find the nodes, Kepler looks for observations of Mars where its ecliptic latitude is close to $0$, then use interpolation to find the exact moment when it is zero and uses then use existing tables such as the Prutenic tables (which were based on Copernicus' theory) to compute the longitude of Mars at that time. Kepler located the ascending node at $225^\circ 44\frac12'$ and the descending node at $46^\circ\frac18'$. These values are not precisely $180^\circ$ apart. The longitudes in the Prutenic tables were measured from the mean sun. Kepler argues that if they were measured from the sun's actual position instead the values would be $180^\circ$ apart.

The Prutenic tables also provided distances to the planets. This allows Kepler to solve the triangle in figure 1 above to compute heliocentric latitude from the observed geocentric latitude, from which he could deduce the orbital inclination of Mars by observing Mars when its latitude was greatest and computing its heliocentric latitude. He finds the orbital inclination to be $1^\circ50'$. This also allowed Kepler to demonstrate the important fact that plane of Mars orbit does not wobble in any way as many theories before him had suggested. Using observations from various points, he shows the orbital inclination is constant.

In chapter 15, Kepler recomputes Tycho's 12 oppositions, so as to determine the precise moment Mars's ecliptic longitude is $180^\circ$ from the sun. For each observation, he determines the ecliptic longitude and latitude of Mars as seen from the Earth, and the time when opposition occurs.

In chapter 16, Kepler constructs his first model, the vicarious hypothesis, to account for the observations. This is a modification of the equant model of Ptolemy. In this model, the planet is assumed to move on a circular orbit, and the speed on the orbit varies in such a way that it appears uniform from some point called the equant. The line connecting the equant and the center of the circle is called the line of apsides, and it intersect the circle at two points, one where the planet moves at its fastest speed called the aphelion and the other where the planet moves at its slowest speed called the perihelion.

For his model, Ptolemy had assumed that the center of the circle lies exactly halfway between the equant and the point from which opposition is measured (which for Kepler is the sun), this model is called bisected eccentricity. Kepler however considers the more general hypothesis that the center of the circle can be placed at any point along the line of apsides between the sun and the equant.

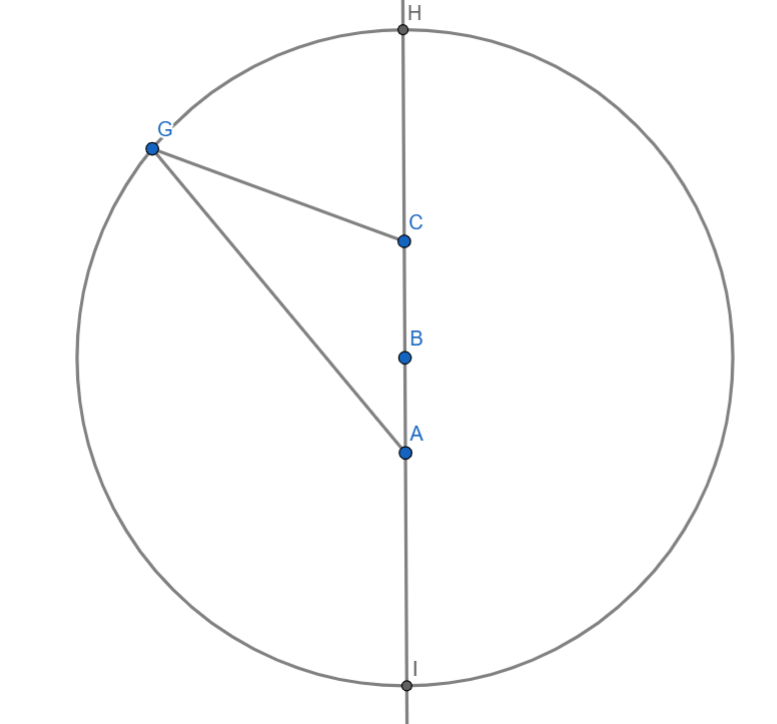

In the diagram above, let $A$ be the sun, $B$ be the center of the circular orbit, and $C$ be the equant point. The points $I$ and $H$ are the perihelion and aphelion respectively. Let $G$ be the position of Mars at a particular observation. The angle $\angle GAH$ Kepler refers to as the true anomaly, and the angle $\angle GCH$ the mean anomaly. For any observation, the true anomaly could be deduced if we knew the longitude of aphelion, by finding the difference between this and the longitude of the observation. The mean anomaly could be deduced if we knew the time when Mars it at aphelion, and by using the fact the Mars, viewed from the equant, traverses equal angles in equal times. If the true anomaly and the mean anomaly were known, we could likewise determine the location of the point $G$ by finding where the lines drawn from $B$ and $A$ intersect. For the purposes of calculation, we can take the length of the line $\overline{CA}$ to be $1$.

Kepler's procedure is to take for 4 observations of Mars at opposition. By taking an initial guess for the longitude of aphelion and the time of aphelion, values could be computed for the mean anomaly and true anomaly of each observation, from which the location of Mars at each observation could be determined by the intersection of the lines $\overline{AG}$ and $\overline{CG}$. If the 4 points do not lie on a circle, then the line of apsides $HI$ is rotated about the point $A$; this shifts the values for the true anomalies, until all 4 points lie on a circle. Then if the center of the circle $B$ is not on the line of apsides, the line $HI$ is rotated about the point $C$ until the point $B$ falls on the line of apsides; this shifts the values for the mean anomalies. But doing this also shifts the position of the points so that they no longer fall on a circle. This procedure is repeated again and again until all 4 points fall on a circle and the center of the circle $B$ falls on the line of apsides $HI$. This iterative process takes a long time to converge. In describing the procedure, Kepler writes:

If thou art bored with this wearisome method of calculation, take pity on me, who had to go through with at least seventy repetitions of it, at a very great loss of time.

At the end of the procedure, Kepler calculates the parameters for the model. He determines the longitude of aphelion as $148^\circ 9$. The eccentricity of the circle is defined to be the distance from the center of the circle to the sun $\overline{AB}$, divided by the radius of the circle $\overline{HB}$, the value Kepler determines to be $0.11332$. The eccentricity of the equant is defined as $\overline{CB}$ divided by the radius of the circle, which he finds to be equal to $0.07232$. The sum of these values is referred to as the total eccentricity.

In chapter 17, Kepler makes a small correction for the fact that the longitude of aphelion and nodes are not constant but shift slowly over time.

In chapters 18-21, Kepler compares the theory to observations. First, he compares the longitude of the remaining 8 oppositions and finds that they all fit the predicted position of Mars to within Tycho's observational accuracy of two minutes of arc. This means that the vicarious hypothesis can be taken as an accurate theory for the true anomaly. Despite this remarkable accuracy, however, Kepler shows that the theory is false. He remarks:

Who would have thought it possible? This hypothesis, so closely in agreement with the observations, is nevertheless false.

Using the latitudes of the opposition and the latitude triangle from figure 1, Kepler is able to find the ratio of the Earth and Mars distances from the sun. The Earth-Sun distances $GH$ are taken from an existing theory given by Tycho Brahe in his Progymnasmata, even though these values are not precisely correct, and the goal of the next part will be to determine a more accurate theory for the Earth's motion. The angles $\angle IHE$ are determined by the latitude of the observations, and the angle $IGH$ is determined from the orbital inclination and the angle between Mars and the node. From this, the remaining sides can be determined, and the distances. By computing such distances, he obtained a lower and upper estimate for the eccentricity of Mars: $0.08$ – $0.09943$. The eccentricity found in the vicarious hypothesis is outside this range.

Kepler then examines another method for determining distances to Mars, by using observations of Mars when it is not at opposition and determining the longitude of Mars. The angle between the sun and Mars as viewed from Earth can be determined from observations. Tycho made many observations of Mars when it is not at opposition and determined the difference in ecliptic longitude between the sun and Mars in the sky. The angle between Mars and the Earth as viewed from the sun can be determined by calculating the heliocentric longitude of Mars from the vicarious hypothesis, and that of the Earth from Tycho's theory and taking the difference. And the distance from the Earth to the sun is given from Tycho's theory. Thus, the Earth, sun and Mars form a triangle, where two angles are known, and one side is given, the remaining sides and angles can be computed. In particular, we can determine the Earth-Mars distance. Computing these distances, Kepler once again finds an eccentricity closer to $0.09$, half the value of the total eccentricity (sum of that of the equant plus that of the circle).

Kepler repeats the calculation where he substituted the mean sun in place of the true sun, to show that exactly the same thing arises in such case. So, the hypothesis of the true sun cannot be at fault. As a final recourse, Kepler considers what would happen if we substituted bisected eccentricity into the vicarious hypothesis (i.e. let the eccentricity of the circle be half the total eccentricity), which is $0.09282$. When he compares this model to the observations of oppositions, he finds the error now increases to 8 minutes of arc, which is greater than Tycho's observational error. He writes:

Now, because they could not be disregarded, these eight minutes alone will lead us along a path to the reform of the whole of Astronomy, and they are the matter for a great part of this work.

The inconsistency in determining the eccentricity means that at least one of the assumptions that went into constructing the vicarious hypothesis must be false: either the orbit is not circular, or there is no equant point a fixed distance away from the center of the circle.

=== Part 3 ===
In the third part, Kepler aims to determine an accurate theory for the motion of the Earth, which will be the steppingstone for determining a more accurate theory for Mars in the next section.

In chapters 22-27, Kepler shows that the Earth does not move uniformly about the center of its orbit. The primary observations for determining the Earth's motion around the sun are direct observations of the sun; its ecliptic longitude as seen from the Earth is the opposite to that seen from the sun. Remarkably, uniform circular motion can match these observations to within an accuracy of one minute of arc, less than the accuracy of Tycho's observation. Tycho himself determined the eccentricity of the Earth's orbit based on his observations and the assumption of uniform circular motion to be $0.03584$. Using the observations of Mars, Kepler finds several methods to show that the eccentricity of the Earth's orbit calculated, on the basis of uniform circular motion, cannot possibly be correct.

One method that Kepler uses is based on the fact that after one complete orbit, Mars returns to exactly the same physical location. Since the orbital period of Mars is 687 days, we find observations of Mars that are spaced 687 days apart. If we assume the existence of a fixed point in space from which the motion of the Earth appears uniform, then the distance from Mars to that point is fixed (since the position of Mars is also fixed) . The angle between Earth and Mars as seen from the equant, can be computed from the Earth's mean anomaly and the fact that the observed angle from the equant changes at a uniform rate. The angle between the Mars and the equant as seen from Earth can be computed from the observed position of Mars, and the fact that this imaginary equant point would appear to move uniformly when viewed from Earth; we can therefore use the Earth's mean anomaly. For this purpose, Kepler makes use of Tycho's tables which are calculated from the sun's mean position.

From a given distance, and two angles we can solve the triangle. From the observations Kepler shows that the distance from the Earth to the equant is not fixed. Therefore, if the Earth's orbit is circular, it cannot be centered on the point from which its motion is uniform. The equant is thus distinct from the center of the Earth's orbit. Kepler additionally uses various other constructions to show that the real eccentricity of the Earth's orbit is close to $0.018$, precisely half the value computed from the assumption of uniform circular motion.

In chapter 28, Kepler shows a method to test the correctness of the hypothesis for the Earth's orbit. This is essentially the $687$ days method in reverse. Compute the distance and angle to the Earth from our hypothesis. Use the observed angles of Mars, and the computed angles from our theory to make the same triangle, except this time the distance to the Earth is given, and we solve for the distance and the heliocentric longitude of Mars. If our hypothesis is correct, then for each observation, the calculated distance to Mars and heliocentric longitude must be exactly the same. This method also allows us to test the critical assumption that Mars really does return to the exact same position after one revolution in its orbit.

In chapters 29-30, Kepler briefly mentions two other ways he had shown that the eccentricity of the Earth should be bisected. First he had measured the angular diameter of the sun in the winter (near perihelion) and summer (near aphelion) and computed the relative distances, which gives an eccentricity consistent with half of Tycho's value. He had also shown in his Mysterium Cosmographicum that the distances of his nested polyhedra hypothesis would match the observations better if he assumed the eccentricity is half what Tycho proposes.

He then proceeds to construct the table for computing the Earth's position based on the eccentricity of 0.018. He admits, in constructing this table, the use of a non-circular orbit, but the theory for that is developed later on.

In chapters 31-36, Kepler considers the reason for this bisection of the eccentricity. The bisection has been shown accurate for the Earth and Mars from the observations. The bisection is also used for the planets Jupiter and Saturn in all theories since Ptolemy. Likewise, Tycho Brahe had shown that this model works well for the moon too. When constructing a theory for Venus and Mercury, Copernicus had added a small epicycle to the orbit that had a period of revolution equal to the orbit of the Earth. Kepler shows that this epicycle can be removed if we bisect the eccentricities of Venus and Mercury as well. Thus the hypothesis of bisected eccentricity is valid for all planets and for the moon.

Since this constitutes a universal law, valid for all planets, Kepler finds it necessary to seek the physical cause of this bisection. Kepler starts by computing the speed of the planet at aphelion and perihelion from this bisected eccentricity model; the result shows that the ratio of the speeds at these points is equal to the inverse ratio of the distances. From this, he introduces the hypothesis that the speed of the planet is inversely proportional to its distance from the sun. Kepler then argues this variation in speed must be the result of a force from the sun. To explain why each planet has a different speed than would otherwise be predicted from extending this inverse distance law to all the planets, Kepler postulates that each planet has its own resistance to the force generated by the sun (a concept similar to inertia). Finally, Kepler establishes magnetism as the likely cause for this force, because it has a similar property of a force weakening with distance. In addition to this, the existence of a magnetic field had recently been discovered for Earth. He therefore suggests the Earth's rotation causes the motion of the moon, and likewise, if the sun too rotates and has a magnetic field, this will be the cause of the planets motion.

In chapter 37, Kepler briefly touches on the subject of Lunar theory. The orbit of the moon required two additional inequalities to explain its motion, these are evection and variation. Kepler argues that both these can be explained by the fact that the moon speeds up in its orbit when it forms a straight line with the Earth and sun. Thus, both the forces from the sun and Earth combine together to move the moon when it is aligned with them in this configuration.

In chapters 38-39, Kepler gives an explanation for why the orbits of the planets are not concentric with the sun. He considers that each planet has its own magnetic force which pushes and pulls it away from the sun, depending on how its poles are oriented with respect to the sun. The physical line of reasoning given also hints at the possibility that the orbit is not circular.

In chapter 40, Kepler gives a method for computing the orbit of the Earth based on these physical hypotheses. Kepler notes the extreme difficulty that arises when trying to compute the speed of the planet as the distance is constantly changing. For this reason, he introduces a shortcut, inspired by Archimedes' method of computing pi. If we break the orbit up into little triangles drawn from the sun, then the distance the planet travels is given by the base of the triangle, and the distance from the sun is given by the height of the triangle. If we choose triangles that divide the planet's motion into equal units of time, then the triangles are shown to have equal area, because as the height decreases, the base must increase by the same amount, as the planet moves faster, and vice versa. Kepler therefore introduces his law of areas, equal areas correspond to equal times.

To calculate the orbit from this, we define the mean anomaly as the time since planet has last reached aphelion divided by the orbital period times 360 degrees. The true anomaly is defined as the angle between the planet and aphelion as viewed from the sun, and eccentric anomaly is the same angle viewed from the center of the orbit.

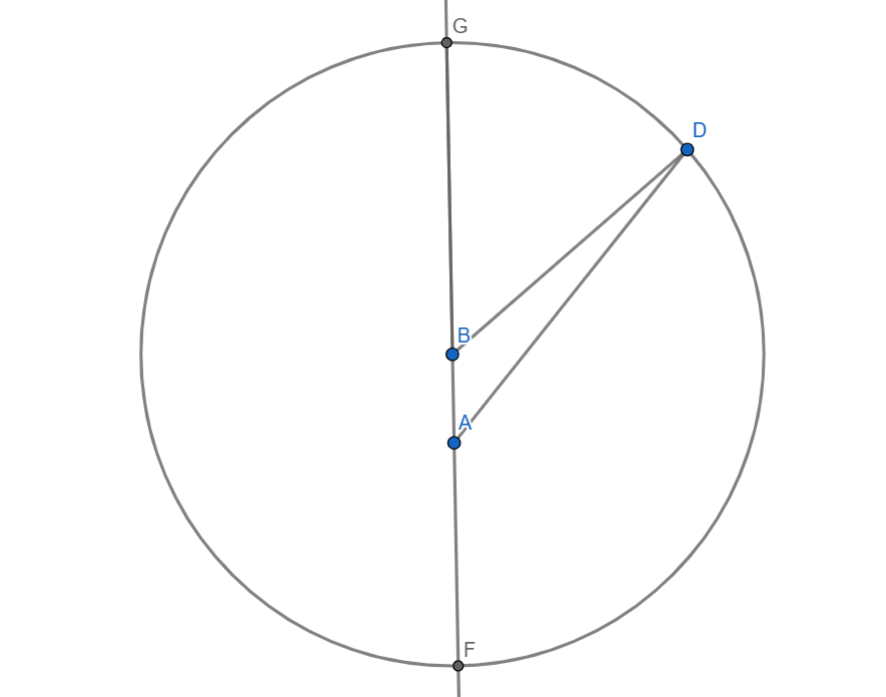

In the diagram above, $A$ is the sun and $B$ is the center of the circle; $G$ is aphelion and $D$ is the planet. The area of the sector $GAD$ is the area swept by the line drawn from the planet to the sun. From the area law, this is proportional to the time that the planet has traversed the segment $GD$ in its orbit, and therefore also the mean anomaly. Thus the area $GAD$ gives the mean anomaly. The eccentric anomaly is defined by the angle $\angle GBD$. Since the angle of a sector, centered on a circle, is always proportional to its area, we can also express this by the area $GBD$. The relation between these two areas gives the relation between the mean anomaly (and therefore time) and eccentric anomaly.

From the diagram, it is clear that the mean anomaly is simply the eccentric anomaly plus the area of the triangle $DAB$. The base of this triangle $\overline{AB}$ is the eccentricity of the circle, and the height of the triangle is proportional to sine of the eccentric anomaly. This is the Kepler equation. If we write $M$ for the mean anomaly, $E$ for the eccentric anomaly, and $e$ for the eccentricity, then this can be written as:

$$M  = E + e \sin (E)$$

Kepler further shows that the true anomaly is given by the eccentric anomaly plus the angle $\angle DBA$. Kepler refers to the angle $\angle DBA$ as the optical equation. For low eccentricities, this angle is approximately twice the area of the triangle $DBA$. If we write the true anomaly as $\vartheta$, this gives the formula:

$$\vartheta \approx E +2e \sin(E)$$

=== Part 4 ===
In part 4, Kepler develops an accurate theory to account for the motion of Mars based on the observations and the physical hypotheses that were laid out in the previous section.

In chapters 41-44, Kepler proves that the orbit of Mars is not a circle. The procedure once again uses the fact that the Earth, sun and Mars form a triangle. The Earth-sun distance can now be calculated accurately from the theory developed in the previous section, and the heliocentric longitude of Mars is determined from the vicarious hypothesis. For any given observation of Mars, the position of Mars can now be plotted accurately using the following procedure: plot the position of Earth using the theory developed in the previous section. Then, draw a line extending from the sun in the direction given by the vicarious hypothesis. Draw a line from the Earth in the direction corresponding to the heliocentric longitude that Mars is observed. The intersection between these two lines is the position of Mars. Finally, a correction is made for the fact that Mars is not in the plane of the ecliptic when observed, by using the latitude determined from the sun. By plotting several points of Mars on its orbit, Kepler shows the path of Mars is smaller at the sides than the best fit circle. thus, the path is an oval.

In chapters 45-50, Kepler attempts to find the physical cause of deviation of the planet from a perfect circular path. He considers the following model: the magnetic rays from the rotating sun move the planet in a circular path. But the planet's own internal magnetic force causes it to move on a circle of its own, creating an epicycle. The motion of the planet on this epicycle is uniform, while the motion of the planet around the sun is non-uniform, its speed being given by the law of area. This motion should create an oval path.

Constructing this oval is extremely difficult however, so Kepler settles on another idea: compute the distances of the planet from its epicycle and use the vicarious hypothesis to determine the direction of the planet from the sun. The oval path that is constructed by this method is slightly wider at the perihelion than at aphelion, so this orbit is properly an egg shape. In order to make use of his law of areas, Kepler needs to determine the area of this egg shape, which is not a trivial problem. Kepler approximates the oval as an ellipse, noting that the area should not differ significantly from the oval.

When Kepler compares this model to the observations, however, he finds an error of 8 minutes of arc in predicted longitudes. This is the same error which was found in the bisected eccentricity model. However, where the bisected eccentricity predicted the planet ahead of its true position, the oval would predict it behind, so the errors were in the opposite direction. After rejecting various possible sources of error in his calculations, Kepler comes to the conclusion that the real path of the planet must lay halfway between bisected eccentricity model and the oval path. This also brings into question physical principles on which this hypothesis is based.

In chapters 51-55, Kepler takes several pairs of observations of Mars that are symmetric along the line of apsides. These observations confirm that the distances to Mars are the same on either side and thus confirms that the line of apsides drawn through the sun is correct, which confirms his physical hypothesis. By taking several of these observations, spaced 687 days apart, Kepler is able to adjust the parameters of Mars orbit until the distances match. Doing this allows him to find more accurate distances for Mars. But the observations also force him to question the accuracy of the vicarious hypothesis outside of opposition observations. So, Kepler takes observations of Mars close to opposition, where the vicarious hypothesis could be trusted. After adjusting the parameters of the orbit until the distances line up, he finds that the distances at the sides are exactly halfway between what is predicted by the oval and the bisected eccentricity model.

In chapters 56-60, Kepler tells the story of how he finally arrived at the correct path for the orbit of Mars. He had noticed that the maximum deviation of the true anomaly and the eccentric anomaly was $5.3^\circ$; he refers to this as the optical equation. The secant of this is $1.00429$, which represented an accurate fit to the deviation of Mars' path from a circle, which he had earlier determined from the observations to be about $0.43%$. He considers the possibility that the distances might be given by the secant of optical equation at other points in its orbit. When computing the numbers, he realized that he had seen them before in an earlier calculation which involved projecting the orbit of Mars on the diameter of an epicycle.

Thus, Kepler declares that the Mars moves as if it is oscillating on the diameter of an epicycle. He examines a possible physical mechanism that could cause such a thing, and he finds that the same mechanism he outlined in Chapter 39 works: the planets' magnetic force pushes or pulls depending on the orientation of its poles. This oscillating motion is shown to be proportional to $\cos (E)$ , so that the radial distance from the sun is given by $r=1-e\cos(E)$, where $E$ is the eccentric anomaly, and $e$ is the eccentricity. What Kepler had just described here is essentially the formula for an ellipse in polar coordinates. However, when he attempted the construction, he made an error, resulting in a completely different orbit which did not match the observations. After returning to his method from earlier, he once again stumbled on the ellipse, only then did he realize his error. He writes:

I laid [the original equation] aside, and fell back on ellipses, believing that this was quite a different hypothesis, whereas the two, as I shall prove in the next chapter, are one in [sic] the same... Ah, what a foolish bird I have been!

=== Part 5 ===
In the final section, Kepler gives an accurate account of the ecliptic latitude of Mars. He also outlines a physical hypothesis to explain why the orbit of planets are not precisely in the same plane.

In chapters 61-62, Kepler determines the values for Mars' ascending and descending nodes. Using the distance to Earth and Mars computed from the previous section, and the observed geocentric latitude of Mars, Kepler is able to determine the heliocentric latitude of Mars at any point in its orbit. From this, Kepler determines each of the parameters using the same methods from chapters 11-14. For the ascending node he finds $46^\circ 32\frac12'$ and for the descending nodes $226^\circ 32\frac12'$. He also determines the orbital inclination to be $1^\circ 49 '$.

In chapter 63, Kepler gives a physical reason why the orbit of the planets are not in the same plane. He considers the idea that the rotation of the sun defines an invariable plane. All the planets are inclined at an angle to this plane, because the planets magnetic field are attracted to a fixed direction in space below this plane.

In chapter 64, Kepler shows that the parallax of Mars must be small. Had there been any noticeable parallax, it would have affected the apparent location of the ascending and descending nodes. But the measured values are exactly $180^\circ$ apart.

In chapters 65-66, Kepler shows that the Mars does not reach closest to the Earth precisely at opposition, but the date of closest approach can be a few days before or after opposition.

In chapters 67-70, Kepler examines several questions relating to the long term behavior of the orbits of Earth and Mars, by comparing his observations with those from the time of Ptolemy. The imprecise nature of some of these observations, as well as the errors, makes it difficult to arrive at conclusive results at times. Some of these questions include: do the eccentricities of orbits change over time? or do the nodes precess at a non-uniform rate?

== Kepler's laws ==
The Astronomia nova records the discovery of the first two of the three principles known today as Kepler's laws of planetary motion, which are:

1. That the planets move in elliptical orbits with the Sun at one focus.
2. That the speed of the planet changes at each moment such that the time between two positions is always proportional to the area swept out on the orbit between these positions.

Kepler discovered the "second law" before the first. He presented his second law in two different forms: In Chapter 32 he states that the speed of the planet varies inversely based upon its distance from the Sun, and therefore he could measure changes in position of the planet by adding up all the distance measures, or looking at the area along an orbital arc. This is his so-called "distance law". In Chapter 59, he states that a radius from the Sun to a planet sweeps out equal areas in equal times. This is his so-called "area law".

However, Kepler's "area-time principle" did not facilitate easy calculation of planetary positions. Kepler could divide up the orbit into an arbitrary number of parts, compute the planet's position for each one of these, and then refer all questions to a table, but he could not determine the position of the planet at each and every individual moment because the speed of the planet was always changing. This paradox, referred to as the "Kepler problem," prompted the development of calculus.

A decade after the publication of the Astronomia nova, Kepler discovered his "third law", published in his 1619 Harmonices Mundi (Harmonies of the world). He found that the ratio of the cube of the length of the semi-major axis of each planet's orbit, to the square of time of its orbital period, is the same for all planets.

== Kepler's knowledge of gravity ==
In his introductory discussion of a moving earth, Kepler addressed the question of how the Earth could hold its parts together if it moved away from the center of the universe which, according to Aristotelian physics, was the place toward which all heavy bodies naturally moved. Kepler proposed an attractive force similar to magnetism, which may have been known by Newton.

Gravity is a mutual corporeal disposition among kindred bodies to unite or join together; thus the earth attracts a stone much more than the stone seeks the earth. (The magnetic faculty is another example of this sort).... If two stones were set near one another in some place in the world outside the sphere of influence of a third kindred body, these stones, like two magnetic bodies, would come together in an intermediate place, each approaching the other by a space proportional to the bulk [moles] of the other.... For it follows that if the earth's power of attraction will be much more likely to extend to the moon and far beyond, and accordingly, that nothing that consists to any extent whatever of terrestrial material, carried up on high, ever escapes the grasp of this mighty power of attraction.

Kepler discusses the Moon's gravitational effect upon the tides as follows:

The sphere of the attractive virtue which is in the moon extends as far as the earth, and entices up the waters; but as the moon flies rapidly across the zenith, and the waters cannot follow so quickly, a flow of the ocean is occasioned in the torrid zone towards the westward. If the attractive virtue of the moon extends as far as the earth, it follows with greater reason that the attractive virtue of the earth extends as far as the moon and much farther; and, in short, nothing which consists of earthly substance anyhow constituted although thrown up to any height, can ever escape the powerful operation of this attractive virtue.

Kepler also clarifies the concept of lightness in terms of relative density, in opposition to the Aristotelian concept of the absolute nature or quality of lightness as follows. His argument could easily be applied today to something like the flight of a hot air balloon.

Nothing which consists of corporeal matter is absolutely light, but that is comparatively lighter which is rarer, either by its own nature, or by accidental heat. And it is not to be thought that light bodies are escaping to the surface of the universe while they are carried upwards, or that they are not attracted by the earth. They are attracted, but in a less degree, and so are driven outwards by the heavy bodies; which being done, they stop, and are kept by the earth in their own place.

In reference to Kepler's discussion relating to gravitation, Walter William Bryant makes the following statement in his book Kepler (1920).

...the Introduction to Kepler's "Commentaries on the Motion of Mars," always regarded as his most valuable work, must have been known to Newton, so that no such incident as the fall of an apple was required to provide a necessary and sufficient explanation of the genesis of his Theory of Universal Gravitation. Kepler's glimpse at such a theory could have been no more than a glimpse, for he went no further with it. This seems a pity, as it is far less fanciful than many of his ideas, though not free from the "virtues" and "animal faculties," that correspond to Gilbert's "spirits and humours".

Kepler considered that this attraction was mutual and was proportional to the bulk of the bodies, but he considered it to have a limited range and he did not consider whether or how this force may have varied with distance. Furthermore, this attraction only acted between "kindred bodies"—bodies of a similar nature, a nature which he did not clearly define. Kepler's idea differed significantly from Newton's later concept of gravitation and it can be "better thought of as an episode in the struggle for heliocentrism than as a step toward Universal gravitation."

Kepler sent Galileo the book while the latter was working on his Dialogue Concerning the Two Chief World Systems (published in 1632, two years after Kepler's death). Galileo had been trying to determine the path of an object falling from rest towards the center of the Earth, but used a semicircular orbit in his calculation.

== Commemoration ==
The 2009 International Year of Astronomy commemorated the 400th anniversary of the publication of this work.
