= Deferent and epicycle =

Planetary motions in archaic models of the Solar System

The epicycles of the planets from the perspective of Earth (Earth at the center). The path-line is the combined motion of the planet's orbit (deferent) around Earth and within the orbit itself (epicycle).

In the Hipparchian, Ptolemaic, and Copernican systems of astronomy, the epicycle (from Ancient Greek ἐπίκυκλος (epíkuklos) 'upon the circle', meaning "circle moving on another circle") was a geometric model used to explain the variations in speed and direction of the apparent motion of the Moon, Sun, and planets. In particular it explained the apparent retrograde motion of the five planets known at the time. Secondarily, it also explained changes in the apparent distances of the planets from the Earth.

The model is often attributed to Apollonius of Perga, who was active at the end of the 3rd century BC. It was developed by Apollonius of Perga and Hipparchus of Rhodes, who used it extensively, during the 2nd century BC, then formalized and extensively used by Ptolemy in his 2nd century AD astronomical treatise the Almagest.

Epicyclical motion is used in the Antikythera mechanism, an ancient Greek astronomical device, for compensating for the elliptical orbit of the Moon, moving faster at perigee and slower at apogee than circular orbits would, using four gears, two of them engaged in an eccentric way that quite closely approximates Kepler's second law.

Epicycles were highly accurate at predicting apparent planetary motion, because, as Fourier analysis later showed, any smooth curve can be approximated to arbitrary accuracy with a sufficient number of epicycles. However, they fell out of favor with the discovery that planetary motions are largely elliptical from a heliocentric frame of reference, which led to the discovery that gravity obeying a simple inverse square law could better explain all planetary motions.

== Introduction ==
The basic elements of Ptolemaic astronomy, showing a planet on an epicycle (smaller dashed circle), a deferent (larger dashed circle), the eccentric (×) and an equant (•).

In both Hipparchian and Ptolemaic systems, the planets are assumed to move in a small circle called an epicycle, whose centre in turn moves along a larger circle called a deferent (Ptolemy himself described the point but did not give it a name). Both circles rotate eastward and are roughly parallel to the plane of the Sun's apparent orbit under those systems (ecliptic). Despite the fact that the system is considered geocentric, neither of the circles were centered on the earth, rather each planet's motion was centered at a planet-specific point slightly away from the Earth called the eccentric. The orbits of planets in this system are similar to epitrochoids, but are not exactly epitrochoids because the angle of the epicycle is not a linear function of the angle of the deferent.

In the Hipparchian system the epicycle rotated and revolved along the deferent with uniform motion. However, Ptolemy found that he could not reconcile that with the Babylonian observational data available to him; in particular, the shape and size of the apparent retrogrades differed. The angular rate at which the epicycle traveled was not constant unless he measured it from another point which is now called the equant (Ptolemy did not give it a name). It was the angular rate at which the deferent moved around the point midway between the equant and the Earth (the eccentric) that was constant; the epicycle center swept out equal angles over equal times only when viewed from the equant. It was the use of equants to decouple uniform motion from the center of the circular deferents that distinguished the Ptolemaic system. For the outer planets, the angle between the center of the epicycle and the planet was the same as the angle between the Earth and the Sun.

Ptolemy did not predict the relative sizes of the planetary deferents in the Almagest. All of his calculations were done with respect to a normalized deferent, considering a single case at a time. This is not to say that he believed the planets were all equidistant, but he had no basis on which to measure distances, except for the Moon. He generally ordered the planets outward from the Earth based on their orbit periods. Later he calculated their distances in the Planetary Hypotheses and summarized them in the first column of this table:

Ptolemy's estimates of orbit sizes
| Body | Mean size (in Earth radii) | Modern value (semimajor axis, in Earth radii) | Ratio (modern/Ptolemy) | Ratio (modern/Ptolemy, normalized to Sun = 1) |
|---|---|---|---|---|
| Moon | 48 | 60.3 | 1.26 | 0.065 |
| Mercury | 115 | 9,090 | 79.0 | 4.1 |
| Venus | 622.5 | 16,980 | 27.3 | 1.4 |
| Sun | 1,210 | 23,480 | 19.4 | 1 |
| Mars | 5,040 | 35,780 | 7.10 | 0.37 |
| Jupiter | 11,504 | 122,200 | 10.6 | 0.55 |
| Saturn | 17,026 | 225,000 | 13.2 | 0.68 |
| Star shell | 20,000 | —N/a | —N/a | —N/a |

Had his values for deferent radii relative to the Earth–Sun distance been more accurate, the epicycle sizes would have all approached the Earth–Sun distance. Although all the planets are considered separately, in one peculiar way they were all linked: the lines drawn from the body through the epicentric center of all the planets were all parallel, along with the line drawn from the Sun to the Earth along which Mercury and Venus were situated. That means that all the bodies revolve in their epicycles in lockstep with Ptolemy's Sun (that is, they all have exactly a one-year period).

Babylonian observations showed that for superior planets the planet would typically move through in the night sky slower than the stars. Each night the planet appeared to lag a little behind the stars, in what is called prograde motion. Near opposition, the planet would appear to reverse and move through the night sky faster than the stars for a time in retrograde motion before reversing again and resuming prograde. Epicyclic theory, in part, sought to explain this behavior.

The inferior planets were always observed to be near the Sun, appearing only shortly before sunrise or shortly after sunset. Their apparent retrograde motion occurs during the transition between evening star into morning star, as they pass between the Earth and the Sun.

== History ==
When ancient astronomers viewed the sky, they saw the Sun, Moon, and stars moving overhead in a regular fashion. Babylonians did celestial observations, mainly of the Sun and Moon as a means of recalibrating and preserving timekeeping for religious ceremonies. Other early civilizations such as the Greeks had thinkers like Thales of Miletus, the first to document and predict a solar eclipse (585 BC), or Heraclides Ponticus. They also saw the "wanderers" or "planetai" (our planets). The regularity in the motions of the wandering bodies suggested that their positions might be predictable.

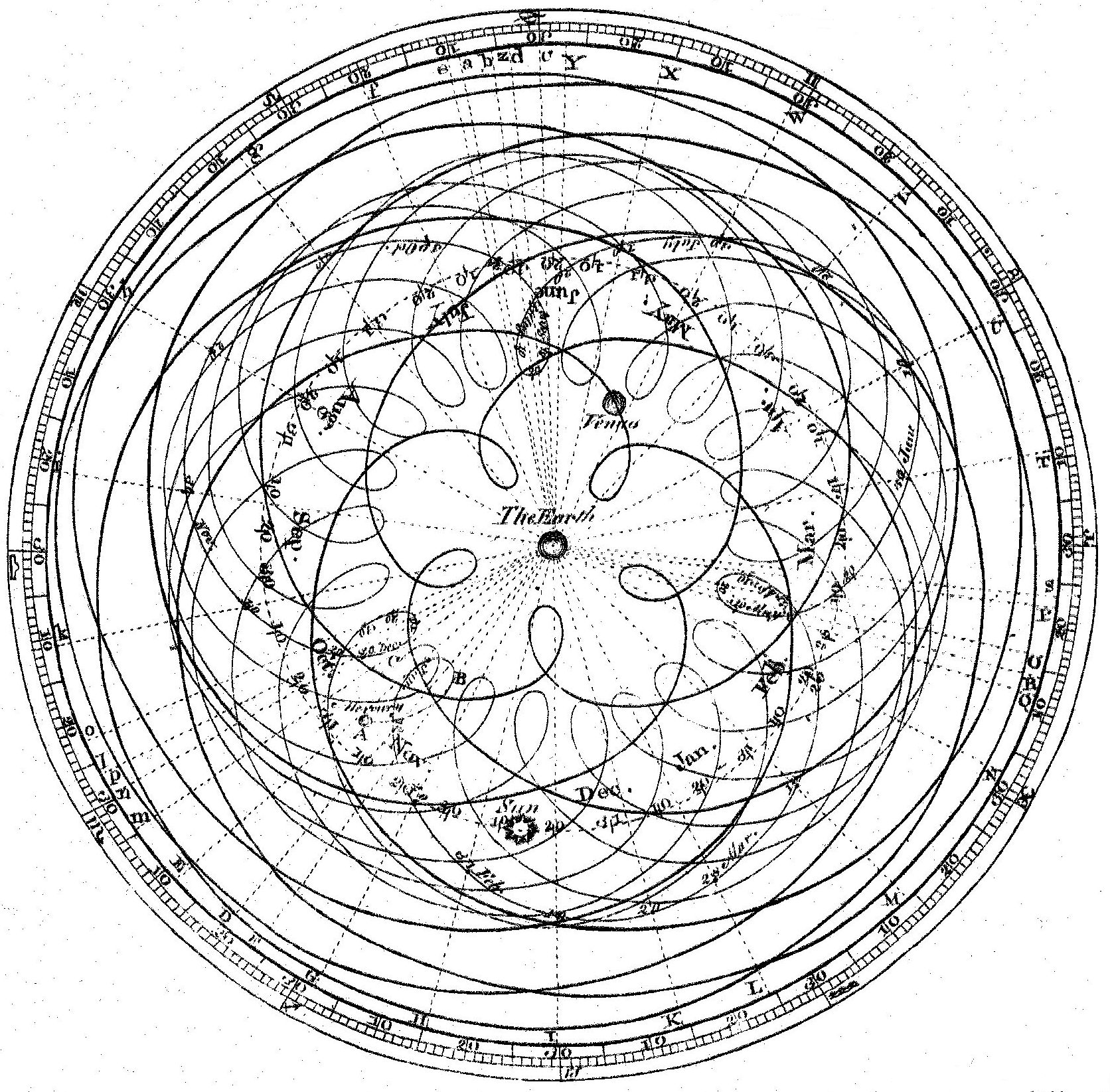
The complexity to be described by the geocentric model

The most obvious approach to the problem of predicting the motions of the heavenly bodies was simply to map their positions against the star field and then to fit mathematical functions to the changing positions. The introduction of better celestial measurement instruments, such as the introduction of the gnomon by Anaximander, allowed the Greeks to have a better understanding of the passage of time, such as the number of days in a year and the length of seasons, which are indispensable for astronomic measurements.

The ancients worked from a geocentric perspective for the simple reason that the Earth was where they stood and observed the sky, and it is the sky which appears to move while the ground seems still and steady underfoot. Some Greek astronomers (e.g., Aristarchus of Samos) speculated that the planets (Earth included) orbited the Sun, but the optics (and the specific mathematics – Isaac Newton's law of gravitation for example) necessary to provide data that would convincingly support the heliocentric model did not exist in Ptolemy's time and would not come around for over fifteen hundred years after his time. Furthermore, Aristotelian physics was not designed with these sorts of calculations in mind, and Aristotle's philosophy regarding the heavens was entirely at odds with the concept of heliocentrism. It was not until Galileo Galilei observed the moons of Jupiter on 7 January 1610, and the phases of Venus in September 1610, that the heliocentric model began to receive broad support among astronomers, who also came to accept the notion that the planets are individual worlds orbiting the Sun (that is, that the Earth is a planet, too). Johannes Kepler formulated his three laws of planetary motion, which describe the orbits of the planets in the Solar System to a remarkable degree of accuracy utilizing a system that employs elliptical rather than circular orbits. Kepler's three laws are still taught today in university physics and astronomy classes, and the wording of these laws has not changed since Kepler first formulated them four hundred years ago.

The apparent motion of the heavenly bodies with respect to time is cyclical in nature. Apollonius of Perga (3rd century BC) realized that this cyclical variation could be represented visually by small circular orbits, or epicycles, revolving on larger circular orbits, or deferents. Hipparchus (2nd century BC) calculated the required orbits. Deferents and epicycles in the ancient models did not represent orbits in the modern sense, but rather a complex set of circular paths whose centers are separated by a specific distance in order to approximate the observed movement of the celestial bodies.

Claudius Ptolemy refined the deferent-and-epicycle concept and introduced the equant as a mechanism that accounts for velocity variations in the motions of the planets. The empirical methodology he developed proved to be extraordinarily accurate for its day and was still in use at the time of Copernicus and Kepler. A heliocentric model is not necessarily more accurate as a system to track and predict the movements of celestial bodies than a geocentric one when considering strictly circular orbits. A heliocentric system would require more intricate systems to compensate for the shift in reference point. It was not until Kepler's proposal of elliptical orbits that such a system became increasingly more accurate than a mere epicyclical geocentric model.

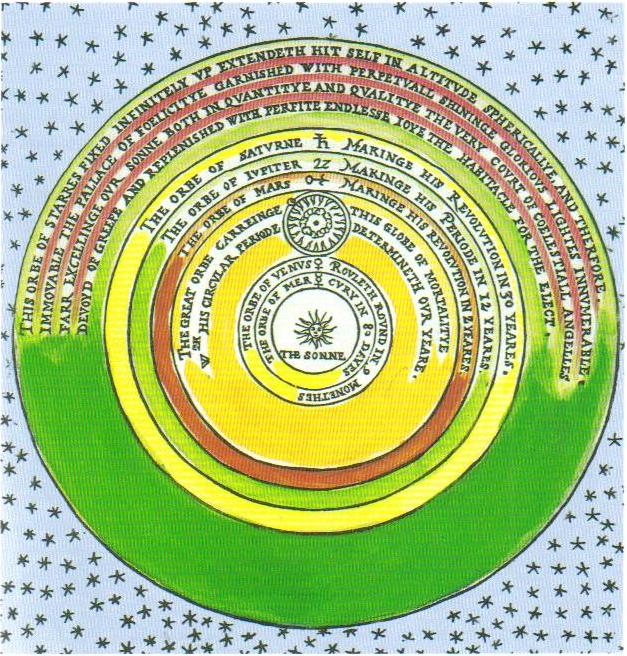
The basic simplicity of the Copernican universe, from Thomas Digges' book

Owen Gingerich describes a planetary conjunction that occurred in 1504 and was apparently observed by Copernicus. In notes bound with his copy of the Alfonsine Tables, Copernicus commented that "Mars surpasses the numbers by more than two degrees. Saturn is surpassed by the numbers by one and a half degrees." Using modern computer programs, Gingerich discovered that, at the time of the conjunction, Saturn indeed lagged behind the tables by a degree and a half and Mars led the predictions by nearly two degrees. Moreover, he found that Ptolemy's predictions for Jupiter at the same time were quite accurate. Copernicus and his contemporaries were therefore using Ptolemy's methods and finding them trustworthy well over a thousand years after Ptolemy's original work was published.

When Copernicus transformed Earth-based observations to heliocentric coordinates, he was confronted with an entirely new problem. The Sun-centered positions displayed a cyclical motion with respect to time but without retrograde loops in the case of the outer planets. In principle, the heliocentric motion was simpler but with new subtleties due to the yet-to-be-discovered elliptical shape of the orbits. Another complication was caused by a problem that Copernicus never solved: correctly accounting for the motion of the Earth in the coordinate transformation. In keeping with past practice, Copernicus used the deferent/epicycle model in his theory but his epicycles were small and were called "epicyclets".

In the Ptolemaic system the models for each of the planets were different, and so it was with Copernicus' initial models. As he worked through the mathematics, however, Copernicus discovered that his models could be combined in a unified system. Furthermore, if they were scaled so that the Earth's orbit was the same in all of them, the ordering of the planets we recognize today easily followed from the math. Mercury orbited closest to the Sun and the rest of the planets fell into place in order outward, arranged in distance by their periods of revolution.

Although Copernicus' models reduced the magnitude of the epicycles considerably, whether they were simpler than Ptolemy's is moot. Copernicus eliminated Ptolemy's somewhat-maligned equant but at a cost of additional epicycles. Various 16th-century books based on Ptolemy and Copernicus use about equal numbers of epicycles. The idea that Copernicus used only 34 circles in his system comes from his own statement in a preliminary unpublished sketch called the Commentariolus. By the time he published De revolutionibus orbium coelestium, he had added more circles. Counting the total number is difficult, but estimates are that he created a system just as complicated, or even more so. Koestler, in his history of man's vision of the universe, equates the number of epicycles used by Copernicus at 48. The popular total of about 80 circles for the Ptolemaic system seems to have appeared in 1898. It may have been inspired by the non-Ptolemaic system of Girolamo Fracastoro, who used either 77 or 79 orbs in his system inspired by Eudoxus of Cnidus. Copernicus in his works exaggerated the number of epicycles used in the Ptolemaic system; although original counts ranged to 80 circles, by Copernicus's time the Ptolemaic system had been updated by Peurbach toward the similar number of 40; hence Copernicus effectively replaced the problem of retrograde with further epicycles.

Copernicus' theory was at least as accurate as Ptolemy's but never achieved the stature and recognition of Ptolemy's theory. What was needed was Kepler's elliptical-orbit theory, not published until 1609 and 1619. Copernicus' work provided explanations for phenomena like retrograde motion, but really did not prove that the planets actually orbited the Sun.

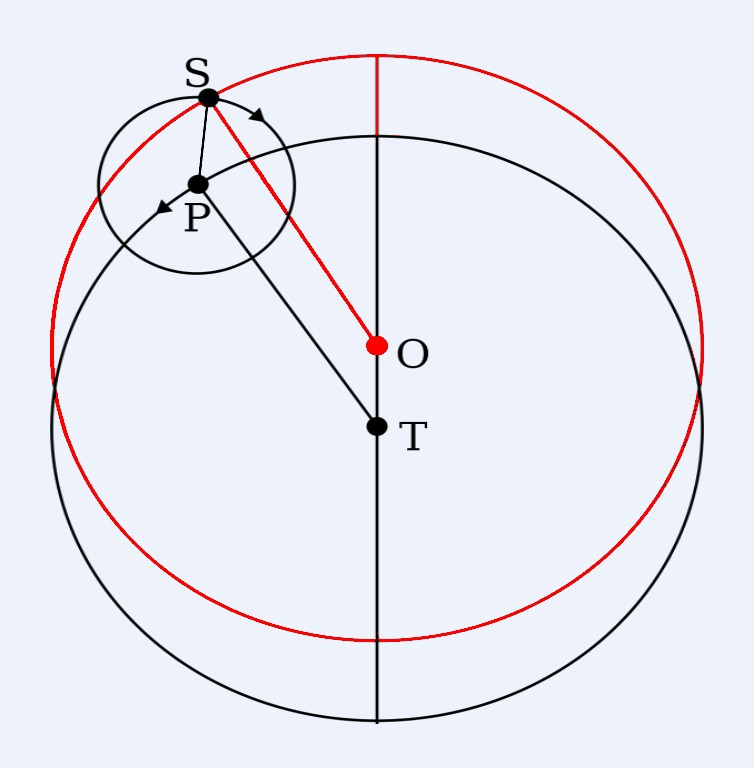
The deferent (O) is offset from the Earth (T). P is the center of the epicycle of the Sun S.

Ptolemy's and Copernicus' theories proved the durability and adaptability of the deferent/epicycle device for representing planetary motion. The deferent/epicycle models worked as well as they did because of the extraordinary orbital stability of the solar system. Either theory could be used today had Gottfried Wilhelm Leibniz and Isaac Newton not invented calculus.

According to Maimonides, the now-lost astronomical system of Ibn Bajjah in 12th century Andalusian Spain lacked epicycles. Gersonides of 14th century France also eliminated epicycles, arguing that they did not align with his observations. Despite these alternative models, epicycles were not eliminated until the 17th century, when Johannes Kepler's model of elliptical orbits gradually replaced Copernicus' model based on perfect circles.

Newtonian or classical mechanics eliminated the need for deferent/epicycle methods altogether and produced more accurate theories. By treating the Sun and planets as point masses and using Newton's law of universal gravitation, equations of motion were derived that could be solved by various means to compute predictions of planetary orbital velocities and positions. If approximated as simple two-body problems, for example, they could be solved analytically, while the more realistic n-body problem required numerical methods for solution.

The power of Newtonian mechanics to solve problems in orbital mechanics is illustrated by the discovery of Neptune. Analysis of observed perturbations in the orbit of Uranus produced estimates of the suspected planet's position within a degree of where it was found. This could not have been accomplished with deferent/epicycle methods. Still, Newton in 1702 published Theory of the Moon's Motion which employed an epicycle and remained in use in China into the nineteenth century. Subsequent tables based on Newton's Theory could have approached arcminute accuracy.

== The number of epicycles ==
According to one school of thought in the history of astronomy, minor imperfections in the original Ptolemaic system were discovered through observations accumulated over time. It was mistakenly believed that more levels of epicycles (circles within circles) were added to the models to match more accurately the observed planetary motions. The multiplication of epicycles is believed to have led to a nearly unworkable system by the 16th century, and that Copernicus created his heliocentric system in order to simplify the Ptolemaic astronomy of his day, thus succeeding in drastically reducing the number of circles.

With better observations additional epicycles and eccentrics were used to represent the newly observed phenomena till in the later Middle Ages the universe became a 'Sphere/With Centric and Eccentric scribbled o'er,/Cycle and Epicycle, Orb in Orb'.

— Dorothy Stimson, The Gradual Acceptance of the Copernican Theory of the Universe, 1917

As a measure of complexity, the number of circles is given as 80 for Ptolemy, versus a mere 34 for Copernicus. The highest number appeared in the Encyclopædia Britannica on Astronomy during the 1960s, in a discussion of King Alfonso X of Castile's interest in astronomy during the 13th century. (Alfonso is credited with commissioning the Alfonsine Tables.)

By this time each planet had been provided with from 40 to 60 epicycles to represent after a fashion its complex movement among the stars. Amazed at the difficulty of the project, Alfonso is credited with the remark that had he been present at the Creation he might have given excellent advice.

— Encyclopædia Britannica, 1968

As it turns out, a major difficulty with this epicycles-on-epicycles theory is that historians examining books on Ptolemaic astronomy from the Middle Ages and the Renaissance have found absolutely no trace of multiple epicycles being used for each planet. The Alfonsine Tables, for instance, were apparently computed using Ptolemy's original unadorned methods.

Another problem is that the models themselves discouraged tinkering. In a deferent-and-epicycle model, the parts of the whole are interrelated. A change in a parameter to improve the fit in one place would throw off the fit somewhere else. Ptolemy's model is probably optimal in this regard. On the whole it gave good results but missed a little here and there. Experienced astronomers would have recognized these shortcomings and allowed for them.

In fact, in Ptolemy's Almagest the Sun has one cycle and the Moon has three: the deferent, an epicycle, and an inner small circle or "epicyclet". Each outer planet has four: deferent, epicycle, equant, and latitude wheel. Venus has two more latitude wheels than the outer planets, so six. Mercury has all of Venus’s cycles plus an epicyclet, or seven. If we include the sphere of the fixed stars, and another sphere to account for the precession of the equinoxes, the total number of cycles and spheres comes to 31.

== Mathematical formalism ==
According to the historian of science Norwood Russell Hanson:

There is no bilaterally-symmetrical, nor eccentrically-periodic curve used in any branch of astrophysics or observational astronomy which could not be smoothly plotted as the resultant motion of a point turning within a constellation of epicycles, finite in number, revolving around a fixed deferent.

— Norwood Russell Hanson, "The Mathematical Power of Epicyclical Astronomy", 1960

Any path—periodic or not, closed or open—can be represented with an infinite number of epicycles. This is because epicycles can be represented as a complex Fourier series; therefore, with a large number of epicycles, very complex paths can be represented in the complex plane.

Let the complex number

$z_0=a_0 e^{i k_0 t}\,,$

where a_{0} and k_{0} are constants, $i=\sqrt{-1}$ is the imaginary unit, and t is time, correspond to a deferent centered on the origin of the complex plane and revolving with a radius a_{0} and angular velocity

$k_0=\frac{2\pi}{T}\,,$

where T is the period.

If z_{1} is the path of an epicycle, then the deferent plus epicycle is represented as the sum

$z_2=z_0+z_1=a_0 e^{i k_0 t}+a_1 e^{i k_1 t}\,.$

This is an almost periodic function, and is a periodic function just when the ratio of the constants k_{j} is rational. Generalizing to N epicycles yields the almost periodic function

$z_N=\sum_{j=0}^N a_j e^{i k_j t}\,,$

which is periodic just when every pair of k_{j} is rationally related. Finding the coefficients a_{j} to represent a time-dependent path in the complex plane, z = f(t), is the goal of reproducing an orbit with deferent and epicycles, and this is a way of "saving the phenomena" (σώζειν τα φαινόμενα).

This parallel was noted by Giovanni Schiaparelli. Pertinent to the Copernican Revolution's debate about "saving the phenomena" versus offering explanations, one can understand why Thomas Aquinas, in the 13th century, wrote:

Reason may be employed in two ways to establish a point: firstly, for the purpose of furnishing sufficient proof of some principle [...]. Reason is employed in another way, not as furnishing a sufficient proof of a principle, but as confirming an already established principle, by showing the congruity of its results, as in astronomy the theory of eccentrics and epicycles is considered as established, because thereby the sensible appearances of the heavenly movements can be explained; not, however, as if this proof were sufficient, forasmuch as some other theory might explain them.

— Thomas Aquinas, Summa Theologica

== Epicycles and the Catholic Church ==
Being a system that was for the most part used to justify the geocentric model, with the exception of Copernicus' cosmos, the deferent and epicycle model was favored over the heliocentric ideas that Kepler and Galileo proposed. Later adopters of the epicyclic model such as Tycho Brahe, who considered the Church's scriptures when creating his model, were seen even more favorably. The Tychonic model was a hybrid model that blended the geocentric and heliocentric characteristics, with a still Earth that has the sun and moon surrounding it, and the planets orbiting the Sun. To Brahe, the idea of a revolving and moving Earth was impossible, and the scripture should be always paramount and respected. When Galileo tried to challenge Tycho Brahe's system, the church was dissatisfied with their views being challenged. Galileo's publication did not aid his case in his trial.

== As an example of bad science ==
"Adding epicycles" has come to be used as a derogatory comment in modern scientific discussion. The term might be used, for example, to describe continuing to try to adjust a theory to make its predictions match the facts. There is a generally accepted idea that extra epicycles were invented to alleviate the growing errors that the Ptolemaic system noted as measurements became more accurate, particularly for Mars. According to this notion, epicycles are regarded by some as the paradigmatic example of bad science.

Copernicus added an extra epicycle to his planets, but that was only in an effort to eliminate Ptolemy's equant, which he considered a philosophical break away from Aristotle's perfection of the heavens. Mathematically, the second epicycle and the equant produce nearly the same results, and many Copernican astronomers before Kepler continued using the equant, as the mathematical calculations were easier. Copernicus' epicycles were also much smaller than Ptolemy's, and were required because the planets in his model moved in perfect circles. Johannes Kepler would later show that the planets move in ellipses, which removed the need for Copernicus' epicycles as well.

== See also ==
- Analemma
- Epicycloid
- Occam's razor
- Overfitting
- Scientific method
