= Apse line =

Component of an orbit

The line of apsides of an ellipse connects point 2 and 3 (major axis).

An apse line, or line of apsides, is an imaginary line defined by an orbit's eccentricity vector. It is strictly defined for elliptic, parabolic, and hyperbolic orbits.

For such orbits the apse line is found:

- for elliptical orbits – between the orbit's periapsis and apoapsis (also known as the major axis)
- for parabolic and hyperbolic orbits – between the orbit's periapsis and focus

For circular orbits, the apse line is not defined because the eccentricity is equal to zero. As it is required as a base for the definition of true anomaly, it is usually arbitrarily assumed (as a line pointing into the direction of the vernal equinox).

== See also ==
- Apsidal precession
- Apsis
- Eccentricity (orbit)
- Orbit: circular, elliptic, parabolic and hyperbolic
- True anomaly
