= Paolo Antonio Foscarini =

Italian scientist and astronomer

Paolo Antonio Foscarini (c. 1565 – 10 June 1616) was a Carmelite priest and scientist, whose book on the mobility of the Earth was condemned by the Roman Inquisition in 1616 along with the writings of Copernicus. Paolo Foscarini was born in Montalto in Calabria, with the family name Scarini. He studied in Naples at the convent of the Carmine Maggiore and was professor of theology in Messina, where he also taught philosophy. He was appointed prior of the convent of Tropea, vicar provincial of the Order in Naples and from 1608 Father Provincial of Calabria. He died at a Carmelite convent he had founded in Montalto.

== Works ==
He published a devotional book, Meditationes, preces, et exercitia quotidiana, in 1611. In 1613 he published a 7-volume encyclopedia of the liberal arts, physics and metaphysics.

But his attempt to publish in 1615 a "Letter of opinion over the Pythagorean and Copernican opinion concerning the mobility of the earth and the stability of the sun" was more contentious. The letter was addressed to the General of the Carmelites, Sebastiano Fantini. In it he addresses the common scriptural objections to the Copernican system.

This reached Galileo when his own "Letter to Castelli" was being considered by the Inquisition. But Cardinal Bellarmine responded to Foscarini saying that both men should confine themselves to treating the Copernican system as pure hypothesis and that contested passages in the Bible should not be reinterpreted unless a definitive proof of the Copernican model were to be produced. Subsequently, the book was banned, unlike the others which were only censored.

An English translation by Thomas Salusbury was published in 1661.

== Epistle concerning the mobility of the earth ==
Foscarini starts by observing:

"Because the common system of the world devised by Ptolemy has hitherto satisfied none of the learned, hereupon a suspicion is risen up amongst all, even Ptolemy's followers themselves, that there must be some other system which is more true than this of Ptolemy...The telescope (an optick invention) has been found out, by help of which many remarkable things in the heavens...were discovered...By this same instrument it appears very probable that Venus and Mercury do not move properly about the Earth, but rather about the sun; and that the Moon alone moveth about the earth.
"Now can there a better or more commodious hypothesis be devised than this of Copernicus? For this cause many modern authors are induced to approve of, and follow it: but with much hesitancy and fear, in regard that it seemeth in their opinion so to contradict the Holy scriptures, as that it cannot possibly be reconciled to them. Which is the reason that this opinion has been long suppressed and is now entertained by men in a modest manner, and as it were with a veiled face."

He identifies 6 classes of statements in the Bible that are taken to oppose the movement of the world:

1. the Earth stands still, and does not move
2. the sun moves and rotates about the earth
3. Heaven is above, and the Earth beneath
4. Hell is in the Centre of the World
5. Heaven is always opposed to the Earth
6. the sun, after the day of Judgment shall stand immoveable in the East, and the Moon in the West (derived from scholastic opinion)

He resolves these in turn mainly by the use of metaphor and the common way of speaking.

== Works ==
- Foscarini, Paolo Antonio (1615). Lettera del R.P.M. Paolo Antonio Foscarini, Carmelitano, Sopra l'Opinione de' Pittagorici, e del Copernico, Della Mobilita della terra, e stabilita del sole, e del nuono Pittagorico Sistema del Mondo [Epistle concerning the Pythagorian and Copernican opinion of the Mobility of the Earth and stability of the sun and of the new system or constitution of the WORLD.] (in Italian). Napoli: Lazaro Scoriggio.
- Foscarini, Paolo Antonio (1661). "Epistle concerning the Pythagorian and Copernican opinion of the Mobility of the Earth and stability of the sun and of the new system or constitution of the WORLD." (PDF). Mathematical Collections and Translations. transl. Thomas Salusbury. pp. 471–503.
