= Nicolaus Copernicus =

Mathematician and astronomer (1473–1543)

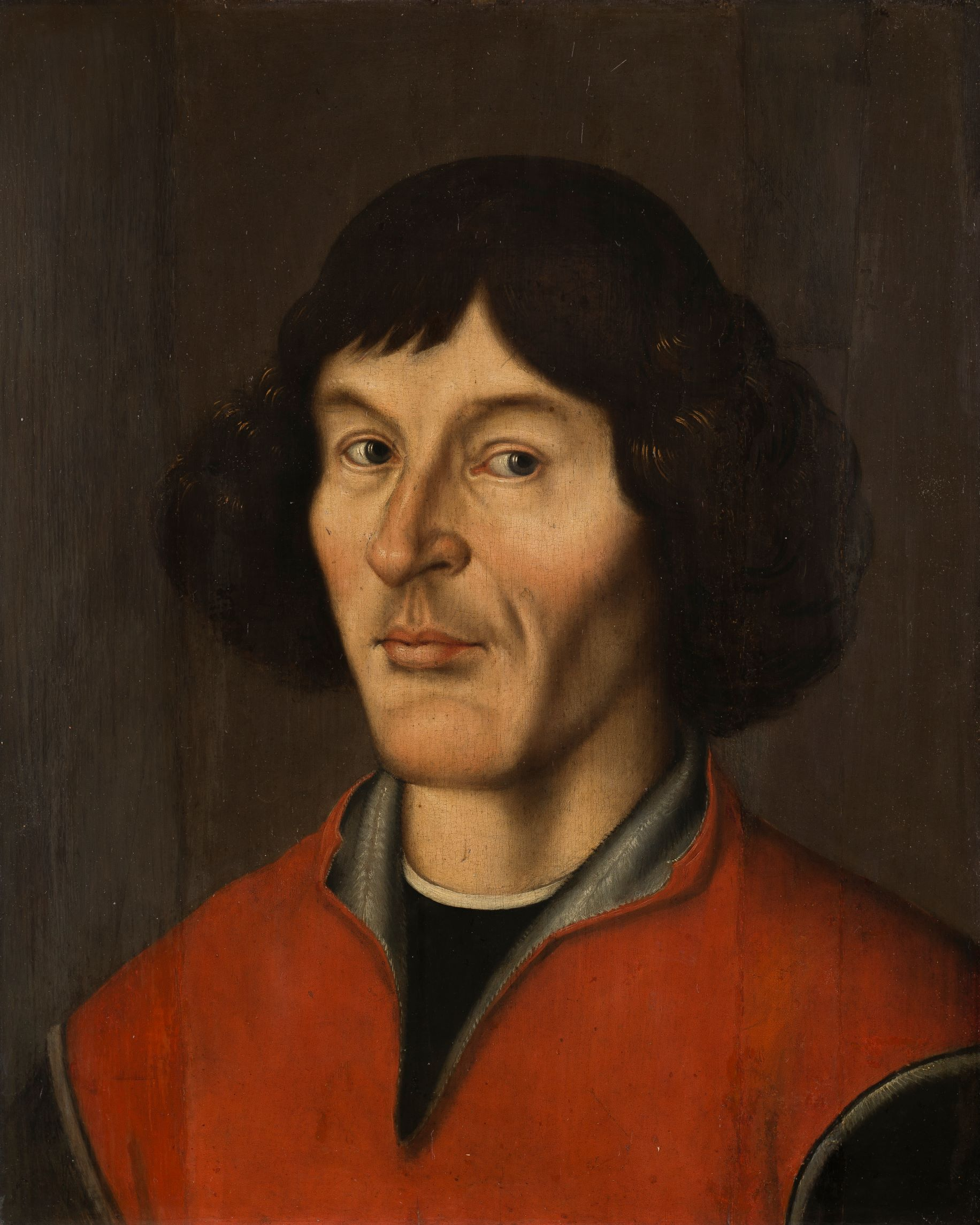
- "Toruń portrait" (c. 1580) (Note: The oldest known portrait of Copernicus is that on the Strasbourg astronomical clock, made by Tobias Stimmer c. 1571–1574. According to the inscription next to that portrait, it was made from a self-portrait by Copernicus himself. This has led to speculation that the Toruń portrait, whose provenance is unknown, may be a copy based on the same self-portrait.)
- Born: 19 February 1473; Thorn, Royal Prussia, Kingdom of Poland
- Died: 24 May 1543 (aged 70); Frauenburg, Royal Prussia, Kingdom of Poland
- Education: University of Kraków (1491–1495); University of Bologna (1496–1500); University of Padua (1501–1503); University of Ferrara (DCanL, 1503)
- Known for: Copernican heliocentrism; Quantity theory of money; Gresham–Copernicus law
- Scientific career
- Fields: Astronomy; Canon law; Economics; Mathematics; Medicine; Politics
- Academic advisors: Domenico Maria Novara da Ferrara
- Notable students: Georg Joachim Rheticus

Nicolaus Copernicus (Note: /koʊˈpɜːrnɪkəs, kəˈ-/ koh-PUR-nik-əs, kə-; Polish: Mikołaj Kopernik [miˈkɔwaj kɔˈpɛrɲik]; Middle Low German: Niklas Koppernigk; German: Nikolaus Kopernikus.) (19 February 1473 – 24 May 1543) was a Renaissance polymath who formulated a model of the universe that placed the Sun rather than Earth at its center. The publication of Copernicus's model in his book De revolutionibus orbium coelestium (On the Revolutions of the Celestial Spheres), just before his death in 1543, was a major event in the history of science, triggering the Copernican Revolution and making a pioneering contribution to the Scientific Revolution. Though a similar heliocentric model had been developed eighteen centuries earlier by Aristarchus of Samos, an ancient Greek astronomer, Copernicus likely arrived at his model independently. (Note: The Greek mathematician and astronomer Aristarchus of Samos proposed such a system during the third century BCE (Dreyer 1953, pp. 135–48). In an early unpublished manuscript of De Revolutionibus (which still survives in the Jagiellonian Library in Kraków), Copernicus wrote that "It is credible that ... Philolaus believed in the mobility of the Earth and some even say that Aristarchus was of that opinion", a passage that was removed from the published edition, a decision described by Owen Gingerich as "eminently sensible" "from an editorial viewpoint". Philolaus was not a heliocentrist as he thought that both the Earth and the Sun moved around a central fire. Gingerich says that there is no evidence that Copernicus was aware of the few clear references to Aristarchus's heliocentrism in ancient texts (as distinct from one other unclear and confusing one), especially Archimedes's The Sand-Reckoner (which was not in print until the year after Copernicus died), and that it would have been in his interest to mention them had he known of them, before concluding that he developed his idea and its justification independently of Aristarchus.) (Note: Dava Sobel (2011) writes: "Copernicus had no idea that Aristarchus of Samos had proposed much the same thing [as Copernicus was contemplating by 1510, when he wrote his Brief Sketch, otherwise also known as the Commentariolus] in the third century B.C. The only work by Aristarchus known to Copernicus—a treatise called On the Sizes and Distances of the Sun and Moon—made no mention of a heliocentric plan." Sobel (2011) pp. 18–19. Sobel further writes that in Copernicus's dedication of On the Revolutions to Pope Paul III—which Copernicus hoped would dampen criticism of his heliocentric theory by "babblers ... completely ignorant of [astronomy]"—the book's author wrote that, in rereading all of philosophy, in the pages of Cicero and Plutarch he had found references to those few thinkers who dared to move the Earth "against the traditional opinion of astronomers and almost against common sense." Sobel comments: "He still knew nothing of the Earth-moving plan of Aristarchus, which had not yet been reported to Latin audiences" (pp. 179–82).) (Note: George Kish (1978) argues that Copernicus knew about Aristarchus's heliocentric theory, saying: "Copernicus himself admitted that the theory was attributed to Aristarchus, though this does not seem to be generally known. ... it is a curious fact that Copernicus did mention the theory of Aristarchus in a passage which he later suppressed.")

Copernicus was born and died in Royal Prussia, a semi-autonomous and multilingual region created within the Crown of the Kingdom of Poland from lands regained from the Teutonic Order after the Thirteen Years' War.

A polyglot and polymath, he obtained a doctorate in canon law and was a mathematician, astronomer, physician, classics scholar, translator, governor, diplomat, and economist. From 1497 he was a Warmian Cathedral chapter canon. In 1517 he derived a quantity theory of money—a key concept in economics—and in 1519 he formulated an economic principle that later came to be called Gresham's law. (Note: "Copernicus seems to have drawn up some notes [on the displacement of good coin from circulation by debased coin] while he was at Olsztyn in 1519. He made them the basis of a report on the matter, written in German, which he presented to the Prussian Diet held in 1522 at Grudziądz ... He later drew up a revised and enlarged version of his little treatise, this time in Latin, and setting forth a general theory of money, for presentation to the Diet of 1528.")

== Life ==
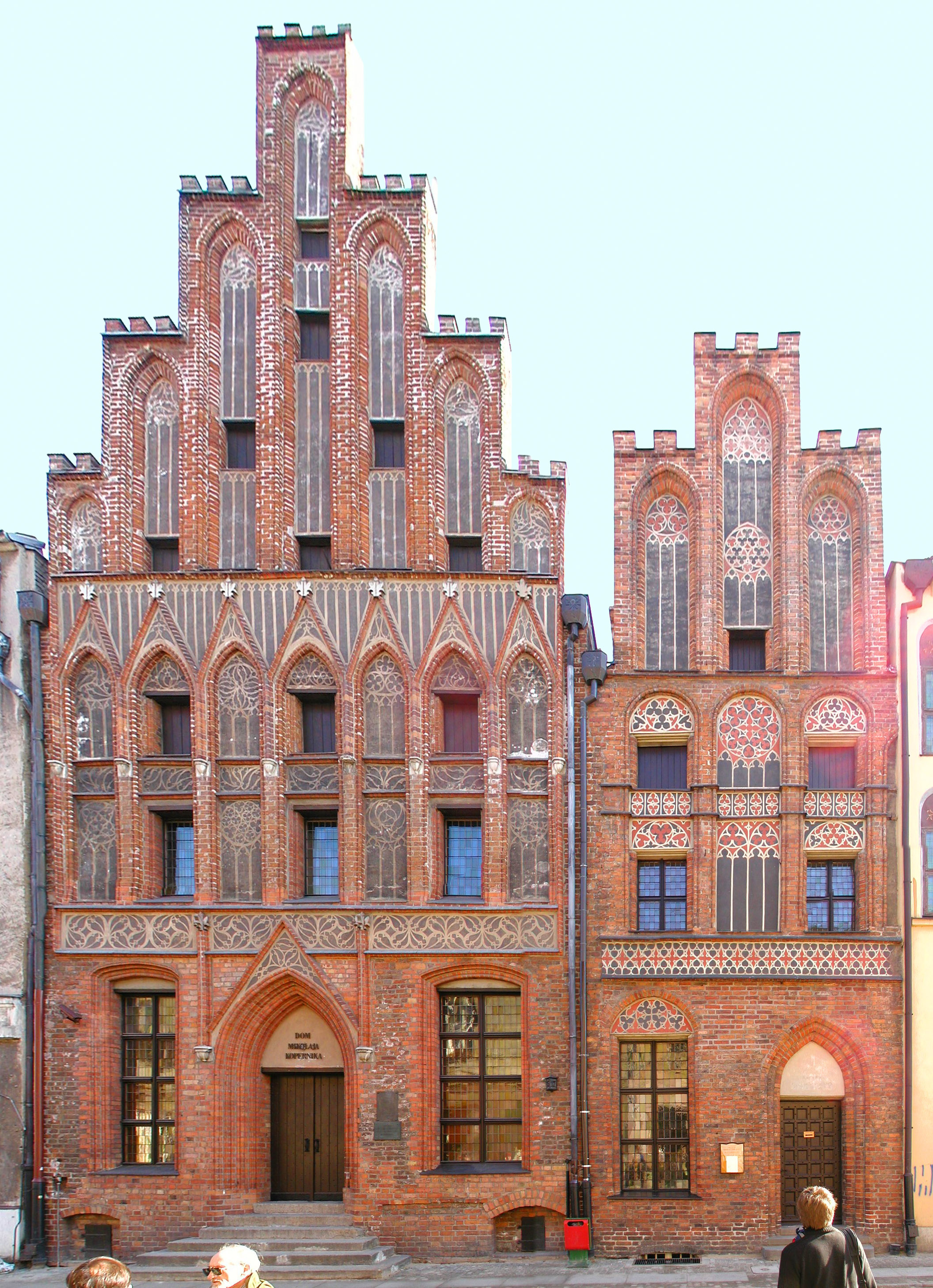
Copernicus's Toruń birthplace (ul. Kopernika 15, left). Together with no. 17 (right), it forms Muzeum Mikołaja Kopernika.

Nicolaus Copernicus was born on 19 February 1473 in the city of Thorn (Toruń), in the province of Royal Prussia, in the Crown of the Kingdom of Poland, to German-speaking parents.

His father was a merchant from Kraków and his mother was the daughter of a wealthy Thorn merchant. Nicolaus was the youngest of four children. His brother Andreas (Andrew) became an Augustinian canon at Frauenburg (Frombork). His sister Barbara, named after her mother, became a Benedictine nun and, in her final years, prioress of a convent in Kulm (Chełmno); she died after 1517. His sister Katharina married the businessman and Thorn city councilor Barthel Gertner and left five children, whom Copernicus looked after to the end of his life. Copernicus never married and is not known to have had children, but from at least 1531 until 1539 his relations with Anna Schilling, a live-in housekeeper, were seen as scandalous by two bishops of Warmia who urged him over the years to break off relations with his "mistress".

=== Father's family ===
Copernicus's father's family originally migrated eastward to Silesia in the thirteenth century. The family can be traced to a village between Nysa (Neiße) and Prudnik (Neustadt). The village's name has been variously spelled Kopernik, (Note: "The name of the village, not unlike that of the astronomer's family, has been variously spelled. A large German atlas of Silesia, published by Wieland in Nuremberg in 1731, spells it Kopernik.") Copernik, Copernic, Kopernic, Coprirnik, and modern Koperniki.

In the 14th century, members of the family began moving to various other Silesian cities, to the Polish capital, Kraków (1367), and to Thorn (1400). In 1396, Niklas Koppernigk, the astronomer's great-great-grandfather, became a burgher of Kraków. The father, likewise named Niklas Koppernigk, likely the son of Jan (or Johann), was first recorded in Kraków in 1448.

Nicolaus was named after his father, who appears in records for the first time as a well-to-do merchant who dealt in copper, selling it mostly in Danzig (Gdańsk). He moved from Kraków to Thorn around 1458. Thorn, situated on the Vistula River, was at that time embroiled in the Thirteen Years' War, in which the Kingdom of Poland and the Prussian Confederation, an alliance of Prussian cities, gentry and clergy, fought the Teutonic Order over control of the region. In this war, Hanseatic cities like Danzig and Thorn, Nicolaus Copernicus's hometown, chose to support the Polish King, Casimir IV Jagiellon, who promised to respect the cities' traditional vast independence, which the Teutonic Order had challenged. Nicolaus's father was actively engaged in the politics of the day and supported Poland and the cities against the Teutonic Order. In 1454 he mediated negotiations between Poland's Cardinal Zbigniew Oleśnicki and the Prussian cities for repayment of war loans. In the Second Peace of Thorn (1466), the Teutonic Order formally renounced all claims to the conquered lands, which returned to Poland as Royal Prussia and remained part of it until the First (1772) and Second (1793) Partitions of Poland.

Copernicus's father married Barbara Watzenrode, the astronomer's mother, between 1461 and 1464. He died between 18 July 1483 and 19 August 1485.

=== Mother's family ===
Nicolaus's mother, Barbara Watzenrode, was the daughter of a wealthy Thorn patrician and city councillor, Lucas Watzenrode the Elder (deceased 1462), and Katherina von Rüdiger, the widow of Thorn councillor Henrich Peckau. Their son Johann became an uncle-like figure to the young Nicolaus Copernicus. Katherina, mentioned in other sources as Katarzyna Rüdiger gente Modlibóg deceased in 1476. The Modlibógs were a prominent Polish family who had been well known in Poland's history since 1271. The Watzenrode family, like the Koppernigk family, had come from Silesia from near Schweidnitz (Świdnica), and after 1360 had settled in Thorn. They soon became one of the wealthiest and most influential patrician families. Through the Watzenrodes' extensive family relationships by marriage, Copernicus was related to wealthy families of Thorn, Danzig and Elbing (Elbląg), and to prominent Polish noble families of Prussia: the Czapskis, Działyńskis, Konopackis and Kościeleckis. Lucas and Katherine had three children: Lucas Watzenrode the Younger (1447–1512), who would become Bishop of Warmia and Copernicus's patron; Barbara, the astronomer's mother (deceased after 1495); and Christina (deceased before 1502), who in 1459 married the Thorn merchant and mayor, Tiedeman von Allen.

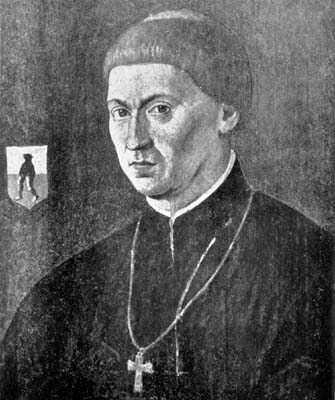
Copernicus's maternal uncle, Lucas Watzenrode the Younger

Lucas Watzenrode the Elder, a wealthy merchant and in 1439–62 president of the judicial bench, was a decided opponent of the Teutonic Knights. In 1453 he was the delegate from Thorn at the Graudenz (Grudziądz) conference that planned the uprising against them. During the ensuing Thirteen Years' War, he actively supported the Prussian cities' war effort with substantial monetary subsidies (only part of which he later re-claimed), with political activity in Thorn and Danzig, and by personally fighting in battles at Łasin (Lessen) and Marienburg (Malbork). He died in 1462.

Lucas Watzenrode the Younger, the astronomer's maternal uncle and patron, was educated at the University of Kraków and at the universities of Cologne and Bologna. He was a bitter opponent of the Teutonic Order, (Note: "In 1512, Bishop Watzenrode died suddenly after attending King Sigismund's wedding feast in Kraków. Rumors abounded that the bishop had been poisoned by agents of his long-time foe, the Teutonic Knights.") and its Grand Master once referred to him as "the devil incarnate". (Note: "[Watzenrode] was also firm, and the Teutonic Knights, who remained a constant menace, did not like him at all; the Grand Master of the order once described him as 'the devil incarnate'. [Watzenrode] was the trusted friend and advisor of three [Polish] kings in succession: John Albert, Alexander (not to be confused with the poisoning pope), and Sigismund; and his influence greatly strengthened the ties between Warmia and Poland proper.") In 1489 Watzenrode was elected Bishop of Warmia (Ermeland, Ermland) against the preference of King Casimir IV, who had hoped to install his own son in that seat. As a result, Watzenrode quarreled with the king until Casimir IV's death three years later. Watzenrode was then able to form close relations with three successive Polish monarchs: John I Albert, Alexander Jagiellon, and Sigismund I the Old. He was a friend and key advisor to each ruler, and his influence greatly strengthened the ties between Warmia and Poland proper. Watzenrode came to be considered the most powerful man in Warmia, and his wealth, connections and influence allowed him to secure Copernicus's education and career as a canon at Frauenburg Cathedral. (Note: "To obtain for his nephews [Nicolaus and Andreas] the necessary support [for their studies in Italy], the bishop [Lucas Watzenrode the Younger] procured their election as canons by the chapter of Frauenburg (1497–1498).")

=== Education ===
==== Early education ====
Copernicus's father died around 1483, when the boy was 10. His maternal uncle, Lucas Watzenrode the Younger (1447–1512), took Copernicus under his wing and saw to his education and career. Six years later, Watzenrode was elected Bishop of Warmia. Watzenrode maintained contacts with leading intellectual figures in Poland and was a friend of the influential Italian-born humanist and Kraków courtier Filippo Buonaccorsi. There are no surviving primary documents on the early years of Copernicus's childhood and education. Copernicus biographers assume that Watzenrode first sent young Copernicus to St. John's School, at Thorn, where he himself had been a master. Later, according to Armitage, (Note: Dobrzycki and Hajdukiewicz (1969) describe Copernicus having attended school at Włocławek as unlikely.) the boy attended the Cathedral School at Włocławek, up the Vistula River from Thorn, which prepared pupils for entrance to the University of Kraków.

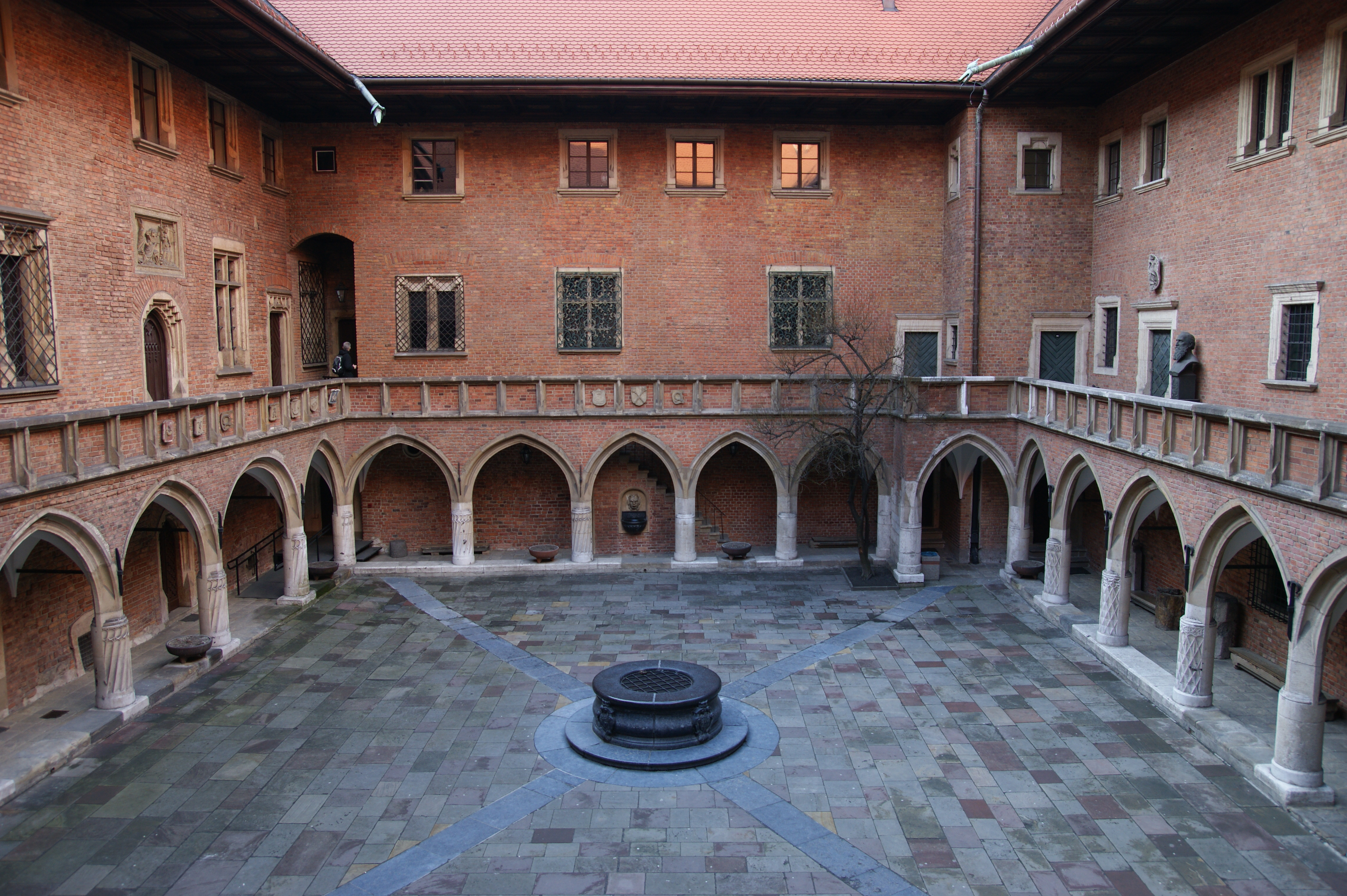
Collegium Maius at Kraków University, Copernicus's Polish alma mater

===== University of Kraków 1491–1495 =====
In the winter semester of 1491–92 Copernicus, as "Nicolaus Nicolai de Thuronia", matriculated together with his brother Andrew at the University of Kraków. Copernicus began his studies in the Department of Arts (from the fall of 1491, presumably until the summer or fall of 1495) in the heyday of the Kraków astronomical-mathematical school, acquiring the foundations for his subsequent mathematical achievements. According to a later but credible tradition (Jan Brożek), Copernicus was a pupil of Albert Brudzewski, who by then (from 1491) was a professor of Aristotelian philosophy but taught astronomy privately outside the university; Copernicus became familiar with Brudzewski's widely read commentary to Georg von Peuerbach's Theoricæ novæ planetarum and almost certainly attended the lectures of Bernard of Biskupie and Wojciech Krypa of Szamotuły, and probably other astronomical lectures by Jan of Głogów, Michał of Wrocław (Breslau), Wojciech of Pniewy, and Marcin Bylica of Olkusz.

====== Mathematical astronomy ======
Copernicus's Kraków studies gave him a thorough grounding in the mathematical astronomy taught at the university (arithmetic, geometry, geometric optics, cosmography, theoretical and computational astronomy) and a good knowledge of the philosophical and natural-science writings of Aristotle (De coelo, Metaphysics) and Averroes, stimulating his interest in learning and making him conversant with humanistic culture. Copernicus broadened the knowledge that he took from the university lecture halls with independent reading of books that he acquired during his Kraków years (Euclid, Haly Abenragel, the Alfonsine Tables, Johannes Regiomontanus' Tabulae directionum); to this period, probably, also date his earliest scientific notes, preserved partly at Uppsala University. At Kraków Copernicus began collecting a large library on astronomy; it would later be carried off as war booty by the Swedes during the Deluge in the 1650s and has been preserved at the Uppsala University Library.

====== Contradictions in the systems of Aristotle and Ptolemy ======
Copernicus's four years at Kraków played an important role in the development of his critical faculties and initiated his analysis of logical contradictions in the two "official" systems of astronomy—Aristotle's theory of homocentric spheres, and Ptolemy's mechanism of eccentrics and epicycles—the surmounting and discarding of which would be the first step toward the creation of Copernicus's own doctrine of the structure of the universe.

===== Warmia, 1495–1496 =====
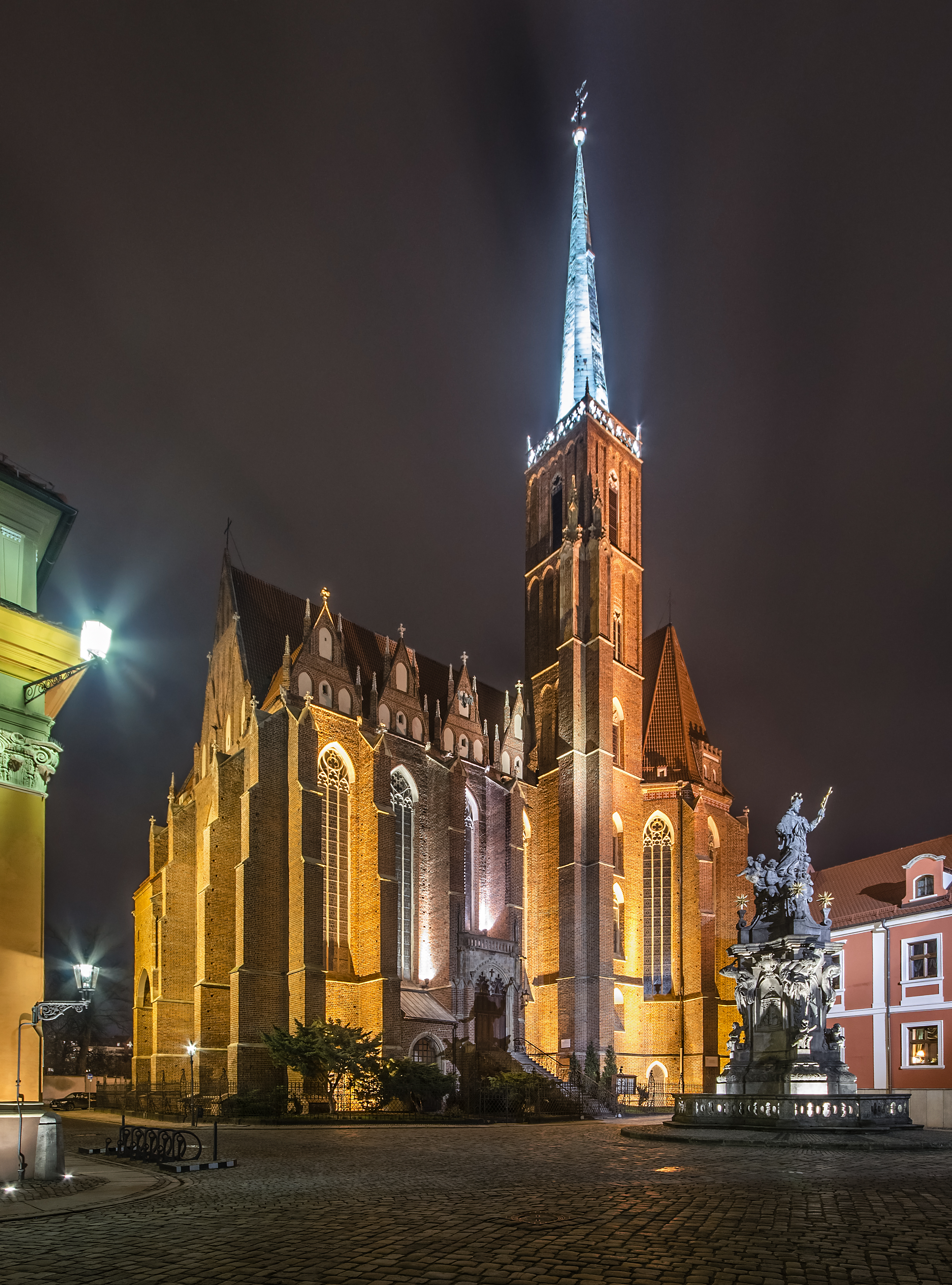
Collegiate Church of the Holy Cross and St. Bartholomew in Wrocław

Without taking a degree, probably in the fall of 1495, Copernicus left Kraków for the court of his uncle Watzenrode, who in 1489 had been elevated to Prince-Bishop of Warmia and soon (before November 1495) sought to place his nephew in the Warmia canonry vacated by the 26 August 1495 death of its previous tenant, Jan Czanow. For unclear reasons—probably due to opposition from part of the chapter, who appealed to Rome—Copernicus's installation was delayed, inclining Watzenrode to send both his nephews to study canon law in Italy, seemingly with a view to furthering their ecclesiastic careers and thereby also strengthening his own influence in the Warmia chapter.

On 20 October 1497, Copernicus, by proxy, formally succeeded to the Warmia canonry which had been granted to him two years earlier. To this, by a document dated 10 January 1503 at Padua, he would add a sinecure at the Collegiate Church of the Holy Cross and St. Bartholomew in Wrocław (at the time in the Crown of Bohemia). Despite having been granted a papal indult on 29 November 1508 to receive further benefices, through his ecclesiastic career Copernicus not only did not acquire further prebends and higher stations (prelacies) at the chapter, but in 1538 he relinquished the Wrocław sinecure. It is unclear whether he was ever ordained a priest. Edward Rosen asserts that he was not as does John Farrell writing for Forbes. Copernicus did take minor orders, which sufficed for assuming a chapter canonry. The Catholic Encyclopedia proposes that his ordination was probable, as in 1537 he was one of four candidates for the episcopal seat of Warmia, a position that required ordination.

==== Italy ====
===== University of Bologna, 1496–1501 =====
Meanwhile, leaving Warmia in mid-1496—possibly with the retinue of the chapter's chancellor, Jerzy Pranghe, who was going to Italy—in the fall, possibly in October, Copernicus arrived in Bologna. He and his brother Andreas enrolled in the faculty of law at the University of Bologna for the winter semester beginning on 19 October 1496 and joined the university's "German nation" (Natio Germanorum), (Note: the other nations at Bologna being the Gallic, Portuguese, Provencal, Burgundian, Savoyard, Aragonese, Navarrese, Hungarian, Polish, Bohemian, Flemish and Italian) the largest of the university's foreign student associations, because German was their home language; its statutes of 1497 defined the "nation of the Germans" by German mother tongue.

During his three-year stay at Bologna, which occurred between fall 1496 and spring 1501, Copernicus seems to have devoted himself less keenly to studying canon law (he received his doctorate in canon law only after seven years, following a second return to Italy in 1503) than to studying the humanities—probably attending lectures by Filippo Beroaldo, Antonio Urceo, called Codro, Giovanni Garzoni, and Alessandro Achillini—and to studying astronomy. He met the famous astronomer Domenico Maria Novara da Ferrara and became his disciple and assistant. Nicolaus spent some time as a lodger in Novara's home. Copernicus was developing new ideas inspired by reading the "Epitome of the Almagest" (Epitome in Almagestum Ptolemei) by George von Peuerbach and Johannes Regiomontanus (Venice, 1496). He verified its observations about certain peculiarities in Ptolemy's theory of the Moon's motion, by conducting on 9 March 1497 at Bologna a memorable observation of the occultation of Aldebaran, the brightest star in Taurus, by the Moon. Copernicus the humanist sought confirmation for his growing doubts through close reading of Greek and Latin authors (Pythagoras, Aristarchos of Samos, Cleomedes, Cicero, Pliny the Elder, Plutarch, Philolaus, Heraclides, Ecphantos, Plato), gathering, especially while at Padua, fragmentary historic information about ancient astronomical, cosmological and calendar systems.

Via Galliera 65, Bologna, site of house of Domenico Maria Novara

Close-up of plaque (Note: Translated to English, it reads: "Here, where stood the house of Domenico Maria Novara, professor of the ancient Studium of Bologna, NICOLAUS COPERNICUS, the Polish mathematician and astronomer who would revolutionize concepts of the universe, conducted brilliant celestial observations with his teacher in 1497–1500. Placed on the 5th centenary of [Copernicus's] birth by the City, the University, the Academy of Sciences of the Institute of Bologna, the Polish Academy of Sciences. 1473 [–] 1973.")

===== Rome 1500 =====
Copernicus spent the jubilee year 1500 in Rome, where he arrived with his brother Andrew that spring, doubtless to perform an apprenticeship at the Papal Curia. Here, too, however, he continued his astronomical work begun at Bologna, observing, for example, a lunar eclipse on the night of 5–6 November 1500. According to a later account by Rheticus, Copernicus also—probably privately, rather than at the Roman Sapienza—as a "Professor Mathematum" (professor of astronomy) delivered, "to numerous ... students and ... leading masters of the science", public lectures devoted probably to a critique of the mathematical solutions of contemporary astronomy.

===== University of Padua, 1501–1503 =====
On his return journey doubtless stopping briefly at Bologna, in mid-1501 Copernicus arrived back in Warmia. After receiving a two-year extension of leave from the chapter on 28 July to study medicine (since "he may in future be a useful medical advisor to our Reverend Superior [Bishop Lucas Watzenrode] and the gentlemen of the chapter"), he returned to Italy in late summer or autumn, probably accompanied by his brother Andrew (Note: Copernicus's brother Andreas would, before the end of 1512, develop leprosy and be forced to leave Warmia for Italy. In November 1518 Copernicus would learn that his brother had died.) and by Canon Bernhard Sculteti. This time he studied at the University of Padua, famous as a seat of medical learning, and—except for a brief visit to Ferrara in May–June 1503 to pass examinations for, and receive, his doctorate in canon law—he remained at Padua from fall 1501 to summer 1503.

Copernicus studied medicine probably under the direction of leading Padua professors—Bartolomeo da Montagnana, Girolamo Fracastoro, Gabriele Zerbi, Alessandro Benedetti—and read medical treatises that he acquired at this time, by Valescus de Taranta, Jan Mesue, Hugo Senensis, Jan Ketham, Arnold de Villa Nova, and Michele Savonarola, which would form the embryo of his later medical library.

====== Astrology ======
One of the subjects that Copernicus must have studied was astrology, since it was considered an important part of a medical education. However, unlike most other prominent Renaissance astronomers, he appears never to have practiced or expressed any interest in astrology.

====== Greek studies ======
As at Bologna, Copernicus did not limit himself to his official studies. It was probably the Padua years that saw the beginning of his Hellenistic interests. He familiarized himself with Greek language and culture with the aid of Theodorus Gaza's grammar (1495) and Johannes Baptista Chrestonius's dictionary (1499), expanding his studies of antiquity, begun at Bologna, to the writings of Bessarion, Lorenzo Valla, and others. There also seems to be evidence that it was during his Padua stay that the idea finally crystallized, of basing a new system of the world on the movement of the Earth. As the time approached for Copernicus to return home, in spring 1503 he journeyed to Ferrara where, on 31 May 1503, having passed the obligatory examinations, he was granted the degree of Doctor of Canon Law (Nicolaus Copernich de Prusia, Jure Canonico ... et doctoratus). No doubt it was soon after (at latest, in fall 1503) that he left Italy for good to return to Warmia.

=== Planetary observations ===
Copernicus made three observations of Mercury, with errors of −3, −15 and −1 minutes of arc. He made one of Venus, with an error of −24 minutes. Four were made of Mars, with errors of 2, 20, 77, and 137 minutes. Four observations were made of Jupiter, with errors of 32, 51, −11 and 25 minutes. He made four of Saturn, with errors of 31, 20, 23 and −4 minutes.

=== Other observations ===
With Novara, Copernicus observed an occultation of Aldebaran by the Moon on 9 March 1497. Copernicus also observed a conjunction of Saturn and the Moon on 4 March 1500. He saw an eclipse of the Moon on 6 November 1500.

=== Work ===
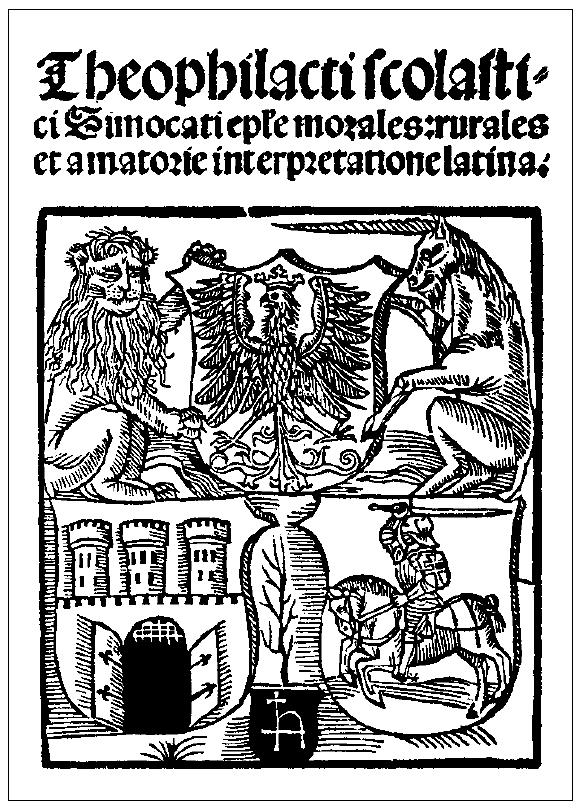
Copernicus's translation of Theophylact Simocatta's Epistles. Cover shows coat of arms of (clockwise from top) Poland, Lithuania, and Kraków

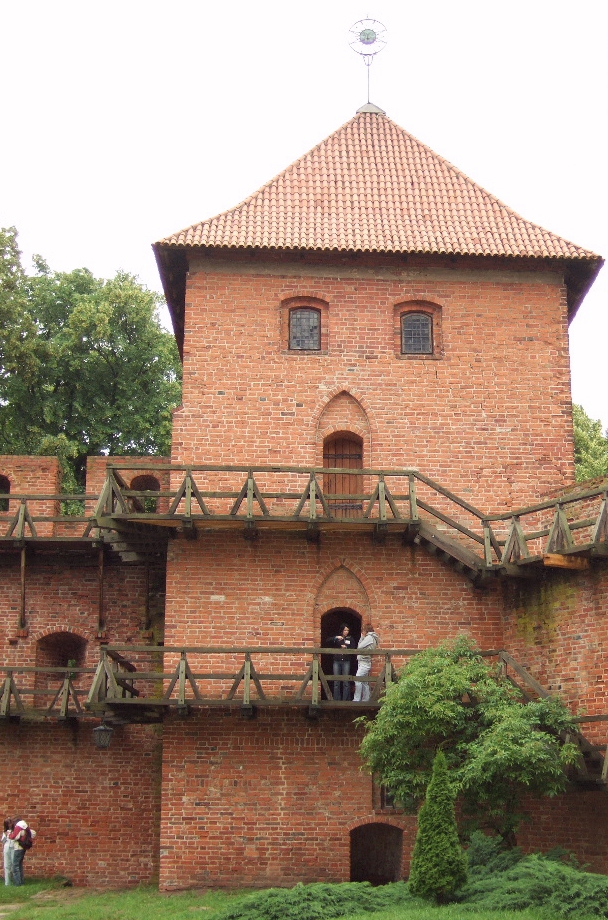
Copernicus's tower at Frombork, where he lived and worked; reconstructed since World War II

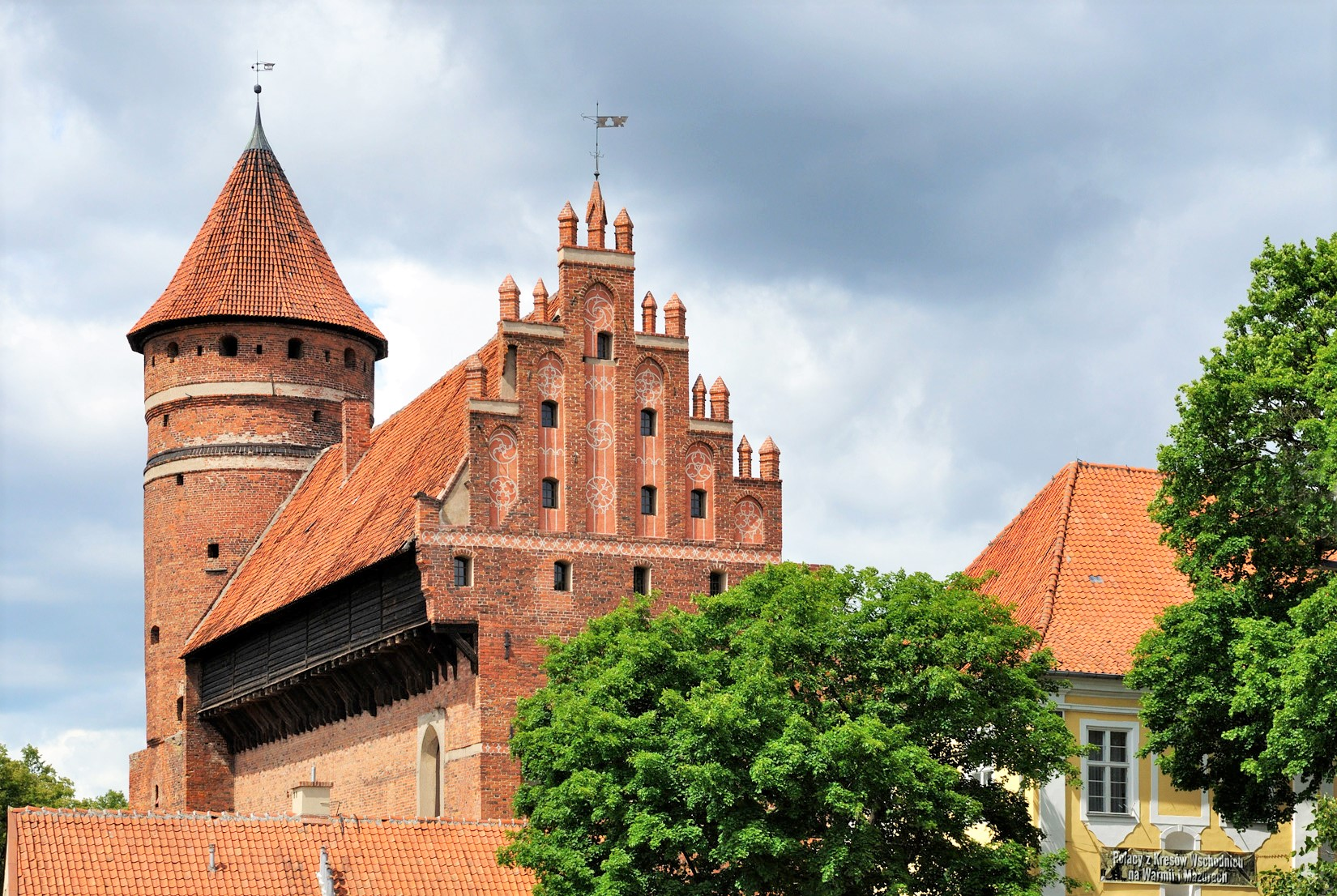
Olsztyn Castle, where Copernicus resided from 1516 to 1521

Having completed all his studies in Italy, 30-year-old Copernicus returned to Warmia, where he would live out the remaining 40 years of his life, apart from brief journeys to Kraków and to nearby Prussian cities: Thorn, Danzig, Elbing, Graudenz, Marienburg, Königsberg (Królewiec).

The Prince-Bishopric of Warmia enjoyed substantial autonomy, with its own diet (parliament) and monetary unit (the same as in the other parts of Royal Prussia) and treasury.

Copernicus was his uncle's secretary and physician from 1503 to 1510 (or perhaps until his uncle's death on 29 March 1512) and resided in the Bishop's castle at Heilsberg (Lidzbark), where he began work on his heliocentric theory. In his official capacity, he took part in nearly all his uncle's political, ecclesiastic and administrative-economic duties. From the beginning of 1504, Copernicus accompanied Watzenrode to sessions of the Royal Prussian diet held at Marienburg and Elbing and, write Dobrzycki and Hajdukiewicz, "participated ... in all the more important events in the complex diplomatic game that ambitious politician and statesman played in defense of the particular interests of Prussia and Warmia, between hostility to the [Teutonic] Order and loyalty to the Polish Crown."

In 1504–1512 Copernicus made numerous journeys as part of his uncle's retinue—in 1504, to Thorn and Danzig, to a session of the Royal Prussian Council in the presence of Poland's King Alexander Jagiellon; to sessions of the Prussian diet at Marienburg (1506), Elbing (1507) and Stuhm (Sztum) (1512); and he may have attended a Poznań (Posen) session (1510) and the coronation of Poland's King Sigismund I the Old in Kraków (1507). Watzenrode's itinerary suggests that in spring 1509 Copernicus may have attended the Kraków sejm.

It was probably on the latter occasion, in Kraków, that Copernicus submitted for printing at Johann Haller's press his translation, from Greek to Latin, of a collection, by the 7th-century Byzantine historian Theophylact Simocatta, of 85 brief poems called Epistles, or letters, supposed to have passed between various characters in a Greek story. They are of three kinds—"moral", offering advice on how people should live; "pastoral", giving little pictures of shepherd life; and "amorous", comprising love poems. They are arranged to follow one another in a regular rotation of subjects. Copernicus had translated the Greek verses into Latin prose, and he published his version as Theophilacti scolastici Simocati epistolae morales, rurales et amatoriae interpretatione latina, which he dedicated to his uncle in gratitude for all the benefits he had received from him. With this translation, Copernicus declared himself on the side of the humanists in the struggle over the question of whether Greek literature should be revived. Copernicus's first poetic work was a Greek epigram, composed probably during a visit to Kraków, for Johannes Dantiscus's epithalamium for Barbara Zapolya's 1512 wedding to King Zygmunt I the Old.

==== Commentariolus – an initial outline of a heliocentric theory ====
Some time before 1514, Copernicus wrote an initial outline of his heliocentric theory known only from later transcripts, by the title (perhaps given to it by a copyist), Nicolai Copernici de hypothesibus motuum coelestium a se constitutis commentariolus—commonly referred to as the Commentariolus. It was a succinct theoretical description of the world's heliocentric mechanism, without mathematical apparatus, and differed in some important details of geometric construction from De revolutionibus; but it was already based on the same assumptions regarding Earth's triple motions. The Commentariolus, which Copernicus consciously saw as merely a first sketch for his planned book, was not intended for printed distribution. He made only a very few manuscript copies available to his closest acquaintances, including, it seems, several Kraków astronomers with whom he collaborated in 1515–1530 in observing eclipses. Tycho Brahe would include a fragment from the Commentariolus in his own treatise, Astronomiae instauratae progymnasmata, published in Prague in 1602, based on a manuscript that he had received from the Bohemian physician and astronomer Tadeáš Hájek, a friend of Rheticus. The Commentariolus would appear complete in print for the first time only in 1878.

==== Astronomical observations, 1513–1516 ====
In 1510 or 1512 Copernicus moved to Frauenburg, a town to the northwest at the Vistula Lagoon on the Baltic Sea coast. There, in April 1512, he participated in the election of Fabian of Lossainen as Prince-Bishop of Warmia. It was only in early June 1512 that the chapter gave Copernicus an "external curia"—a house outside the defensive walls of the cathedral mount. In 1514 he purchased the northwestern tower within the walls of the Frombork stronghold. He would maintain both these residences to the end of his life, despite the devastation of the chapter's buildings by a raid against Frauenburg carried out by the Teutonic Order in January 1520, during which Copernicus's astronomical instruments were probably destroyed. Copernicus conducted astronomical observations in 1513–1516 presumably from his external curia; and in 1522–1543, from an unidentified "small tower" (turricula), using primitive instruments modeled on ancient ones—the quadrant, triquetrum, armillary sphere. At Frombork Copernicus conducted over half of his more than 60 registered astronomical observations.

==== Administrative duties in Warmia ====
Having settled permanently at Frauenburg, where he would reside to the end of his life, with interruptions in 1516–1519 and 1520–21, Copernicus found himself at the Warmia chapter's economic and administrative center, which was also one of Warmia's two chief centers of political life. In the difficult, politically complex situation of Warmia, threatened externally by the Teutonic Order's aggressions (attacks by Teutonic bands; the Polish–Teutonic War of 1519–1521; Albert's plans to annex Warmia), internally subject to strong separatist pressures (the selection of the prince-bishops of Warmia; currency reform), he, together with part of the chapter, represented a program of strict cooperation with the Polish Crown and demonstrated in all his public activities (the defense of his country against the Order's plans of conquest; proposals to unify its monetary system with the Polish Crown's; support for Poland's interests in the Warmia dominion's ecclesiastic administration) that he was consciously a citizen of the Polish–Lithuanian Republic. Soon after the death of uncle Bishop Watzenrode, he participated in the signing of the Second Treaty of Piotrków Trybunalski (7 December 1512), governing the appointment of the Bishop of Warmia, declaring, despite opposition from part of the chapter, for loyal cooperation with the Polish Crown.

That same year (before 8 November 1512) Copernicus assumed responsibility, as magister pistoriae, for administering the chapter's economic enterprises (he would hold this office again in 1530), having already since 1511 fulfilled the duties of chancellor and visitor of the chapter's estates.

His administrative and economic duties did not distract Copernicus, in 1512–1515, from intensive observational activity. The results of his observations of Mars and Saturn in this period, and especially a series of four observations of the Sun made in 1515, led to the discovery of the variability of Earth's eccentricity and of the movement of the solar apogee in relation to the fixed stars, which in 1515–1519 prompted his first revisions of certain assumptions of his system. Some of the observations that he made in this period may have had a connection with a proposed reform of the Julian calendar made in the first half of 1513 at the request of the Bishop of Fossombrone, Paul of Middelburg. Their contacts in this matter in the period of the Fifth Lateran Council were later memorialized in a complimentary mention in Copernicus's dedicatory epistle in Dē revolutionibus orbium coelestium and in a treatise by Paul of Middelburg, Secundum compendium correctionis Calendarii (1516), which mentions Copernicus among the learned men who had sent the Council proposals for the calendar's emendation.

During 1516–1521, Copernicus resided at Allenstein (Olsztyn) Castle as economic administrator of Warmia, including Allenstein and Mehlsack (Pieniężno). While there, he wrote a manuscript, Locationes mansorum desertorum (Locations of Deserted Fiefs), with a view to populating those fiefs with industrious farmers and so bolstering the economy of Warmia. During the Polish–Teutonic War of 1519–1521, Copernicus, as administrator of the cathedral chapter's estates at Allenstein, organised preparations to defend the town and castle against the Teutonic Order. In November 1520, he drafted a letter on behalf of the chapter requesting military assistance from King Sigismund I the Old, although the letter was intercepted before reaching the king. He also arranged for additional weapons and provisions, while the Polish soldiers stationed at Allenstein had their own military commanders. During the Siege of Allenstein in January 1521, Teutonic forces attempted to capture the town on 26 January, but their assault failed. Following the truce of April 1521, Copernicus was appointed Warmiae commissarius in August, representing Warmia during the truce.

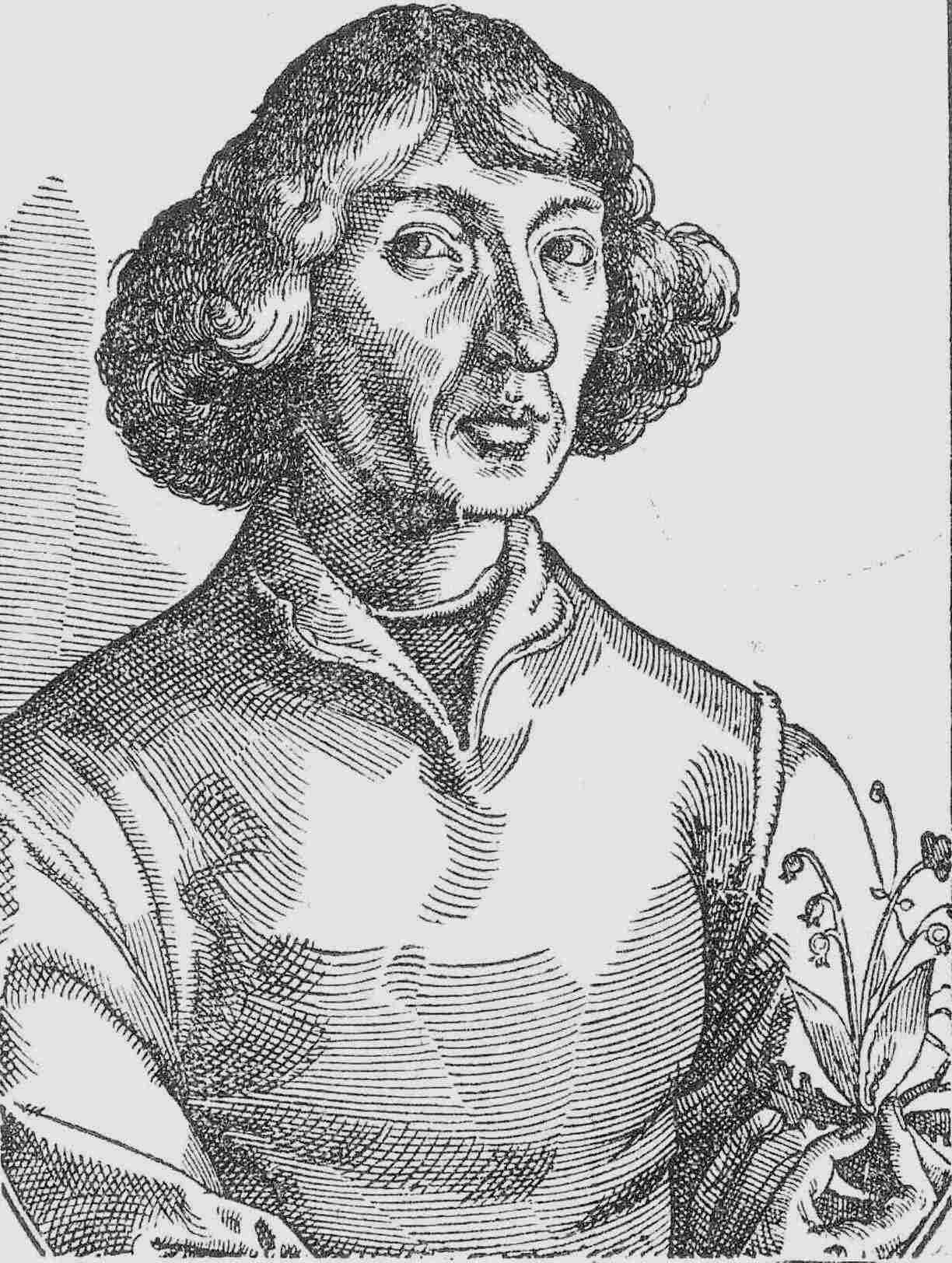
Copernicus holding lily-of-the-valley: portrait in Nicolaus Reusner's Icones (1587). (Note: It was based on a sketch by Tobias Stimmer (c. 1570), allegedly based on a self-portrait by Copernicus. It inspired most later Copernicus depictions.)

===== Advisor on monetary reform =====
Copernicus for years advised the Royal Prussian sejmik on monetary reform, particularly in the 1520s when that was a major question in regional Prussian politics. In 1526 he wrote a study on the value of money, "Monetae cudendae ratio". In it he formulated an early iteration of the theory called Gresham's law, that "bad" (debased) coinage drives "good" (un-debased) coinage out of circulation—several decades before Thomas Gresham. He also, in 1517, set down a quantity theory of money, a principal concept in modern economics. Copernicus's recommendations on monetary reform were widely read by leaders of both Prussia and Poland in their attempts to stabilize currency.

==== Copernican system presented to the Pope ====
In 1533, Johann Widmanstetter, secretary to Pope Clement VII, explained Copernicus's heliocentric system to the Pope and two cardinals. The Pope was so pleased that he gave Widmanstetter a valuable gift. In 1535 Bernard Wapowski wrote a letter to a gentleman in Vienna, urging him to publish an enclosed almanac, which he claimed had been written by Copernicus. This is the only mention of a Copernicus almanac in the historical records. The "almanac" was likely Copernicus's tables of planetary positions. Wapowski's letter mentions Copernicus's theory about the motions of the Earth. Nothing came of Wapowski's request, because he died a couple of weeks later.

Following the death of Prince-Bishop of Warmia Mauritius Ferber (1 July 1537), Copernicus participated in the election of his successor, Johannes Dantiscus (20 September 1537). Copernicus was one of four candidates for the post, written in at the initiative of Tiedemann Giese; but his candidacy was actually pro forma, since Dantiscus had earlier been named coadjutor bishop to Ferber and since Dantiscus had the backing of Poland's King Sigismund I. At first Copernicus maintained friendly relations with the new Prince-Bishop, assisting him medically in spring 1538 and accompanying him that summer on an inspection tour of Chapter holdings. But that autumn, their friendship was strained by suspicions over Copernicus's housekeeper, Anna Schilling, whom Dantiscus banished from Frauenburg in spring 1539.

==== Medical work ====
In his younger days, Copernicus the physician had treated his uncle, brother and other chapter members. In later years he was called upon to attend the elderly bishops who in turn occupied the see of Warmia—Mauritius Ferber and Johannes Dantiscus—and, in 1539, his old friend Tiedemann Giese, Bishop of Kulm. In treating such important patients, he sometimes sought consultations from other physicians, including the physician to Duke Albert and, by letter, the Polish Royal Physician.

In the spring of 1541, Duke Albert—former Grand Master of the Teutonic Order who had converted the Monastic State of the Teutonic Knights into a Lutheran and hereditary realm, the Duchy of Prussia, upon doing homage to his uncle, the King of Poland, Sigismund I—summoned Copernicus to Königsberg to attend the Duke's counselor, Georg von Kunheim, who had fallen seriously ill, and for whom the Prussian doctors seemed unable to do anything. Copernicus went willingly; he had met von Kunheim during negotiations over reform of the coinage. And Copernicus had come to feel that Albert himself was not such a bad person; the two had many intellectual interests in common. The Chapter readily gave Copernicus permission to go, as it wished to remain on good terms with the Duke, despite his Lutheran faith. In about a month the patient recovered, and Copernicus returned to Frauenburg. For a time, he continued to receive reports on von Kunheim's condition, and to send him medical advice by letter.

==== Protestant attacks on the Copernican system ====
Some of Copernicus's close friends turned Protestant, but Copernicus never showed a tendency in that direction. The first attacks on him came from Protestants. Wilhelm Gnapheus, a Dutch refugee settled in Elbing, wrote a comedy in Latin, Morosophus (The Foolish Sage), and staged it at the Latin school that he had established there. In the play, Copernicus was caricatured as the eponymous Morosophus, a haughty, cold, aloof man who dabbled in astrology, considered himself inspired by God, and was rumored to have written a large work that was moldering in a chest.

Elsewhere Protestants were the first to react to news of Copernicus's theory. Melanchthon wrote:

Some people believe that it is excellent and correct to work out a thing as absurd as did that Sarmatian [i.e., Polish] astronomer who moves the earth and stops the sun. Indeed, wise rulers should have curbed such light-mindedness.

Nevertheless, in 1551, eight years after Copernicus's death, astronomer Erasmus Reinhold published, under the sponsorship of Copernicus's former military adversary, the Protestant Duke Albert, the Prussian Tables, a set of astronomical tables based on Copernicus's work. Astronomers and astrologers quickly adopted it in place of its predecessors.

=== Heliocentrism ===
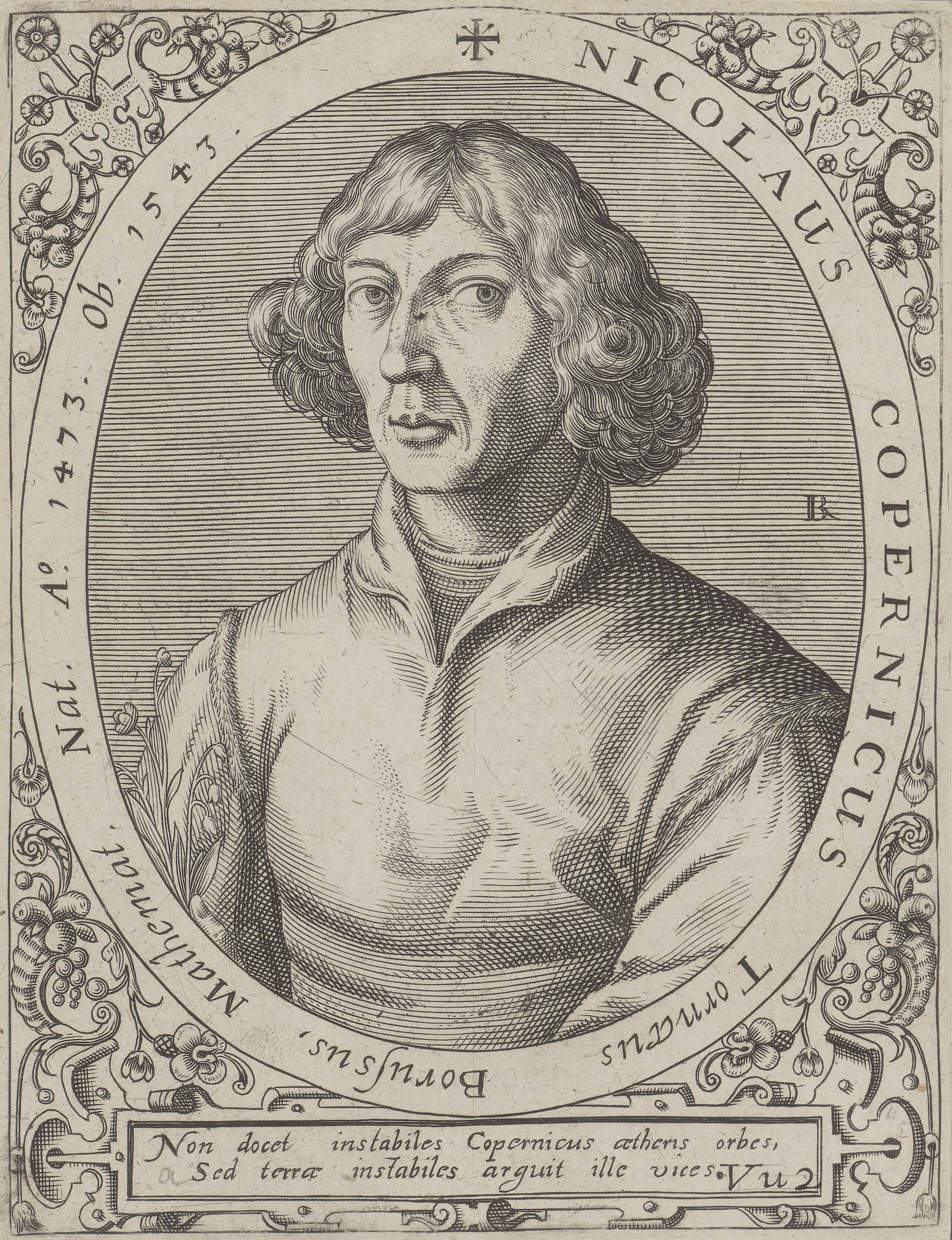
"Nicolaus Copernicus Tornaeus Borussus Mathemat.", 1597

Some time before 1514 Copernicus made available to friends his "Commentariolus" ("Little Commentary"), a manuscript describing his ideas about the heliocentric hypothesis. (Note: A reference to the "Commentariolus" is contained in a library catalogue, dated 1 May 1514, of a 16th-century historian, Matthew of Miechów, so it must have begun circulating before that date (Koyré, 1973, p. 85; Gingerich, 2004, p. 32). Thoren (1990 p. 99) gives the length of the manuscript as 40 pages.) It contained seven basic assumptions (detailed below). Thereafter he continued gathering data for a more detailed work.

At about 1532, Copernicus had basically completed his work on the manuscript of Dē revolutionibus orbium coelestium; but despite urging by his closest friends, he resisted openly publishing his views, not wishing—as he confessed—to risk the scorn "to which he would expose himself on account of the novelty and incomprehensibility of his theses."

==== Reception of the Copernican system in Rome ====
In 1533, Johann Albrecht Widmannstetter delivered a series of lectures in Rome outlining Copernicus's theory. Pope Clement VII and several Catholic cardinals heard the lectures and were interested in the theory. On 1 November 1536, Cardinal Nikolaus von Schönberg, Archbishop of Capua, wrote to Copernicus from Rome:

Some years ago word reached me concerning your proficiency, of which everybody constantly spoke. At that time I began to have a very high regard for you ... For I had learned that you had not merely mastered the discoveries of the ancient astronomers uncommonly well but had also formulated a new cosmology. In it you maintain that the earth moves; that the sun occupies the lowest, and thus the central, place in the universe ... Therefore with the utmost earnestness I entreat you, most learned sir, unless I inconvenience you, to communicate this discovery of yours to scholars, and at the earliest possible moment to send me your writings on the sphere of the universe together with the tables and whatever else you have that is relevant to this subject ...

By then, Copernicus's work was nearing its definitive form, and rumors about his theory had reached educated people all over Europe. Despite urgings from many quarters, Copernicus delayed publication of his book, perhaps from fear of criticism—a fear delicately expressed in the subsequent dedication of his masterpiece to Pope Paul III. Scholars disagree on whether Copernicus's concern was limited to possible astronomical and philosophical objections, or whether he was also concerned about religious objections. (Note: Koyré (1973, pp. 27, 90) and Rosen (1995, pp. 64, 184) take the view that Copernicus was indeed concerned about possible objections from theologians, while Lindberg and Numbers (1986) argue against it. Koestler (1963) also denies it. Indirect evidence that Copernicus was concerned about objections from theologians comes from a letter written to him by Andreas Osiander in 1541, in which Osiander advises Copernicus to adopt a proposal by which he says "you will be able to appease the Peripatetics and theologians whose opposition you fear". (Koyré, 1973, pp. 35, 90))

=== De revolutionibus orbium coelestium ===
Copernicus was still working on De revolutionibus orbium coelestium (even if not certain that he wanted to publish it) when in 1539 Georg Joachim Rheticus, a Wittenberg mathematician, arrived in Frauenburg. Philipp Melanchthon, a close theological ally of Martin Luther, had arranged for Rheticus to visit several astronomers and study with them. Rheticus became Copernicus's pupil, staying with him for two years and writing a book, Narratio prima (First Account), outlining the essence of Copernicus's theory. In 1542 Rheticus published a treatise on trigonometry by Copernicus (later included as chapters 13 and 14 of Book I of De revolutionibus). Under strong pressure from Rheticus, and having seen the favorable first general reception of his work, Copernicus finally agreed to give De revolutionibus to his close friend, Tiedemann Giese, bishop of Kulm, to be delivered to Rheticus for printing by the German printer Johannes Petreius at Nuremberg (Nürnberg), Germany. While Rheticus initially supervised the printing, he had to leave Nuremberg before it was completed, and he handed over the task of supervising the rest of the printing to a Lutheran theologian, Andreas Osiander.

Osiander added an unauthorised and unsigned preface, defending Copernicus's work against those who might be offended by its novel hypotheses. He argued that "different hypotheses are sometimes offered for one and the same motion [and therefore] the astronomer will take as his first choice that hypothesis which is the easiest to grasp." According to Osiander, "these hypotheses need not be true nor even probable. [I]f they provide a calculus consistent with the observations, that alone is enough."

=== Death ===
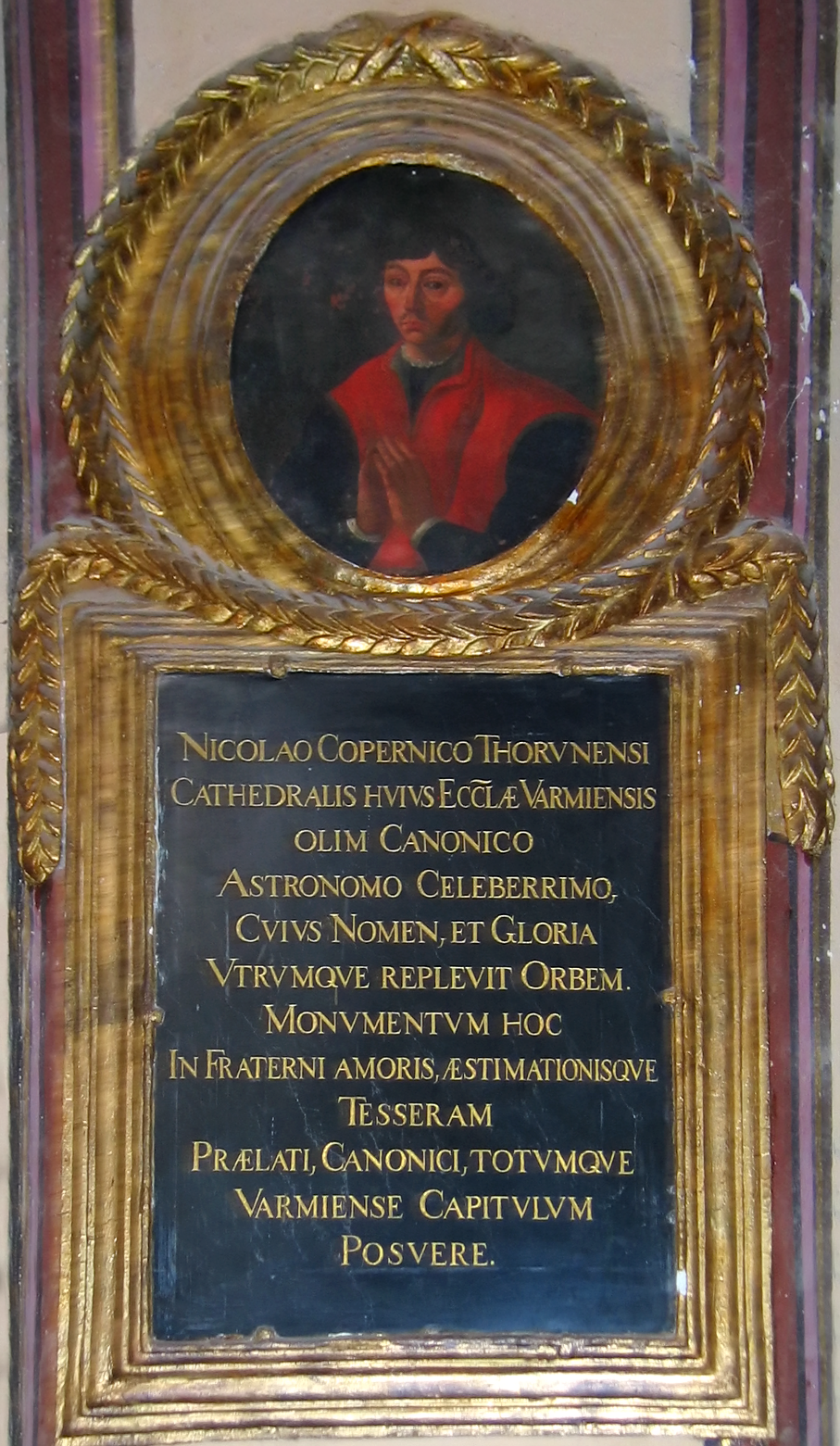
1735 epitaph, Frombork Cathedral

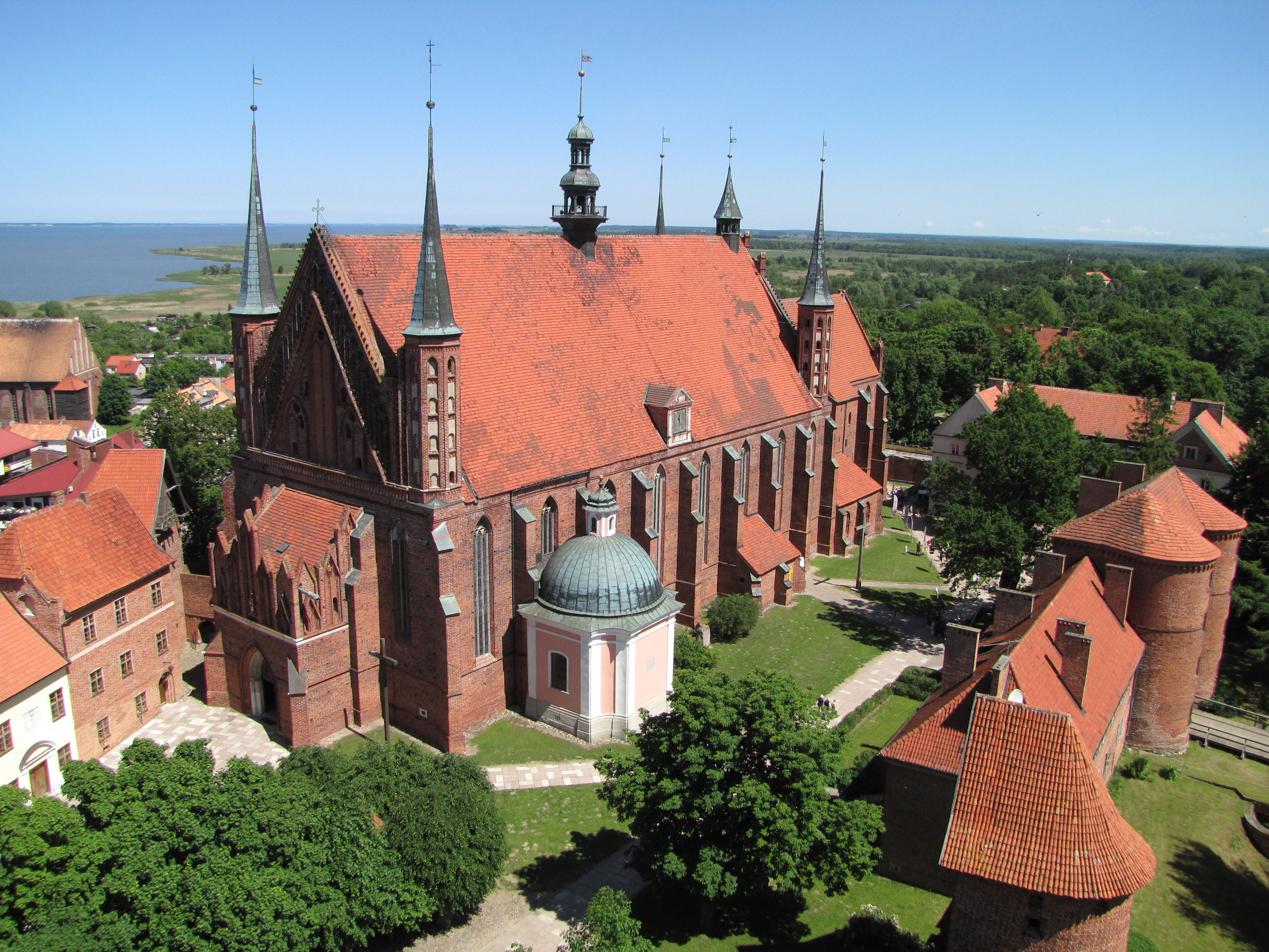
Frombork Cathedral

Toward the close of 1542, Copernicus was seized with apoplexy and paralysis, and he died at age 70 on 24 May 1543. Legend has it that he was presented with the final printed pages of his Dē revolutionibus orbium coelestium on the very day that he died, allowing him to take farewell of his life's work. (Note: According to Bell 1992, p. 111, "... Copernicus, on his deathbed, received the printer's proofs of his epoch-breaking Dē revolutionibus orbium coelestium.") He is reputed to have awoken from a stroke-induced coma, looked at his book, and then died peacefully. (Note: Koestler 1963, page 189, says the following about a letter from Canon Tiedemann Giese to Georg Joachim Rheticus: "[...] the end came only after several months, on 24 May. In a letter to Rheticus, written a few weeks later, Giese recorded the event in a single, tragic sentence: 'For many days he had been deprived of his memory and mental vigour; he only saw his completed book at the last moment, on the day he died.'" Koestler attributes this quotation to Leopold Prowe, Nicolaus Copernicus, Berlin 1883–1884, volume 1, part 2, p. 554.)

Copernicus was reportedly buried in Frombork Cathedral, where a 1580 epitaph stood until being defaced; it was replaced in 1735. For over two centuries, archaeologists searched the cathedral in vain for Copernicus's remains. Efforts to locate them in 1802, 1909, 1939 had come to nought. In 2004 a team led by Jerzy Gąssowski, head of an archaeology and anthropology institute in Pułtusk, began a new search, guided by the research of historian Jerzy Sikorski. In August 2005, after scanning beneath the cathedral floor, they discovered what they believed to be Copernicus's remains.

The discovery was announced only after further research, on 3 November 2008. Gąssowski said he was "almost 100 percent sure it is Copernicus". Forensic expert Capt. Dariusz Zajdel of the Polish Police Central Forensic Laboratory used the skull to reconstruct a face that closely resembled the features—including a broken nose and a scar above the left eye—on a Copernicus self-portrait. The expert also determined that the skull belonged to a man who had died around age 70—Copernicus's age at the time of his death.

The grave was in poor condition, and not all the remains of the skeleton were found; missing, among other things, was the lower jaw. The DNA from the bones found in the grave matched hair samples taken from a book owned by Copernicus which was kept at the library of the University of Uppsala in Sweden.

On 22 May 2010, Copernicus was given a second funeral in a Mass led by Józef Kowalczyk, the former papal nuncio to Poland and newly named Primate of Poland. Copernicus's remains were reburied in the same spot in Frombork Cathedral where part of his skull and other bones had been found. A black granite tombstone identifies him as the founder of the heliocentric theory and also a church canon. The tombstone bears a representation of Copernicus's model of the Solar System—a golden Sun encircled by six of the planets.

== Copernican system ==
=== Predecessors ===
Philolaus (c. 470 – c. 385 BCE) described an astronomical system in which a Central Fire (different from the Sun) occupied the centre of the universe, and a counter-Earth, the Earth, Moon, the Sun itself, planets, and stars all revolved around it, in that order outward from the centre. Heraclides Ponticus (387–312 BCE) proposed that the Earth rotates on its axis. Aristarchus of Samos (c. 310 BCE – c. 230 BCE) was the first to advance a theory that the Earth orbited the Sun. Further mathematical details of Aristarchus's heliocentric system were worked out around 150 BCE by the Hellenistic astronomer Seleucus of Seleucia. Though Aristarchus's original text has been lost, a reference in Archimedes' book The Sand Reckoner (Archimedis Syracusani Arenarius & Dimensio Circuli) describes a work by Aristarchus in which he advanced the heliocentric model. Thomas Heath gives the following English translation of Archimedes's text:

You are now aware ['you' being King Gelon] that the "universe" is the name given by most astronomers to the sphere the centre of which is the centre of the earth, while its radius is equal to the straight line between the centre of the sun and the centre of the earth. This is the common account (τά γραφόμενα) as you have heard from astronomers. But Aristarchus has brought out a book consisting of certain hypotheses, wherein it appears, as a consequence of the assumptions made, that the universe is many times greater than the "universe" just mentioned. His hypotheses are that the fixed stars and the sun remain unmoved, that the earth revolves about the sun on the circumference of a circle, the sun lying in the middle of the orbit, and that the sphere of the fixed stars, situated about the same centre as the sun, is so great that the circle in which he supposes the earth to revolve bears such a proportion to the distance of the fixed stars as the centre of the sphere bears to its surface.

— The Sand Reckoner

In an early unpublished manuscript of De Revolutionibus (which still survives), Copernicus mentioned the (non-heliocentric) 'moving Earth' theory of Philolaus and the possibility that Aristarchus also had a 'moving Earth' theory (though it is unlikely that he was aware that it was a heliocentric theory). He removed both references from his final published manuscript.

Copernicus was probably aware that Pythagoras's system involved a moving Earth. The Pythagorean system was mentioned by Aristotle.

Copernicus owned a copy of Giorgio Valla's De expetendis et fugiendis rebus, which included a translation of Plutarch's reference to Aristarchus's heliostaticism.

In Copernicus's dedication of On the Revolutions to Pope Paul III—which Copernicus hoped would dampen criticism of his heliocentric theory by "babblers ... completely ignorant of [astronomy]"—the book's author wrote that, in rereading all of philosophy, in the pages of Cicero and Plutarch he had found references to those few thinkers who dared to move the Earth "against the traditional opinion of astronomers and almost against common sense."

The prevailing theory during Copernicus's lifetime was the one that Ptolemy published in his Almagest c. 150 CE; the Earth was the stationary center of the universe. Stars were embedded in a large outer sphere that rotated rapidly, approximately daily, while each of the planets, the Sun, and the Moon were embedded in their own, smaller spheres. Ptolemy's system employed devices, including epicycles, deferents and equants, to account for observations that the paths of these bodies differed from simple, circular orbits centered on the Earth.

Beginning in the 10th century, a tradition criticizing Ptolemy developed within Islamic astronomy, which climaxed with Ibn al-Haytham of Basra's Al-Shukūk 'alā Baṭalamiyūs ("Doubts Concerning Ptolemy"). Several Islamic astronomers questioned the Earth's apparent immobility, and centrality within the universe. Some accepted that the earth rotates around its axis, such as Abu Sa'id al-Sijzi (d. c. 1020). According to al-Biruni, al-Sijzi invented an astrolabe based on a belief held by some of his contemporaries "that the motion we see is due to the Earth's movement and not to that of the sky." That others besides al-Sijzi held this view is further confirmed by a reference from an Arabic work in the 13th century which states:

According to the geometers [or engineers] (muhandisīn), the earth is in constant circular motion, and what appears to be the motion of the heavens is actually due to the motion of the earth and not the stars.

In the 12th century, Nur ad-Din al-Bitruji proposed a complete alternative to the Ptolemaic system (although not heliocentric). He declared the Ptolemaic system as an imaginary model, successful at predicting planetary positions, but not real or physical. Al-Bitruji's alternative system spread through most of Europe during the 13th century, with debates and refutations of his ideas continued up to the 16th century.

Tusi couple

Mathematical techniques developed in the 13th to 14th centuries by Mo'ayyeduddin al-Urdi, Nasir al-Din al-Tusi, and Ibn al-Shatir for geocentric models of planetary motions closely resemble some of those used later by Copernicus in his heliocentric models. Copernicus used what is now known as the Urdi lemma and the Tusi couple in the same planetary models as found in Arabic sources. Furthermore, the exact replacement of the equant by two epicycles used by Copernicus in the Commentariolus was found in an earlier work by Ibn al-Shatir (d. c. 1375) of Damascus. Ibn al-Shatir's lunar and Mercury models are also identical to those of Copernicus. This has led some scholars to argue that Copernicus must have had access to some yet to be identified work on the ideas of those earlier astronomers. However, no likely candidate for this conjectured work has yet come to light, and other scholars have argued that Copernicus could well have developed these ideas independently of the late Islamic tradition. Nevertheless, Copernicus cited some of the Islamic astronomers whose theories and observations he used in De Revolutionibus, namely al-Battani, Thabit ibn Qurra, al-Zarqali, Averroes, and al-Bitruji. It has been suggested that the idea of the Tusi couple may have arrived in Europe leaving few manuscript traces, since it could have occurred without the translation of any Arabic text into Latin. One possible route of transmission may have been through Byzantine science; Gregory Chioniades translated some of al-Tusi's works from Arabic into Byzantine Greek. Several Byzantine Greek manuscripts containing the Tusi-couple are still extant in Italy.

=== Copernicus ===
Copernicus's schematic diagram of his heliocentric theory of the Solar System from De revolutionibus orbium coelestium

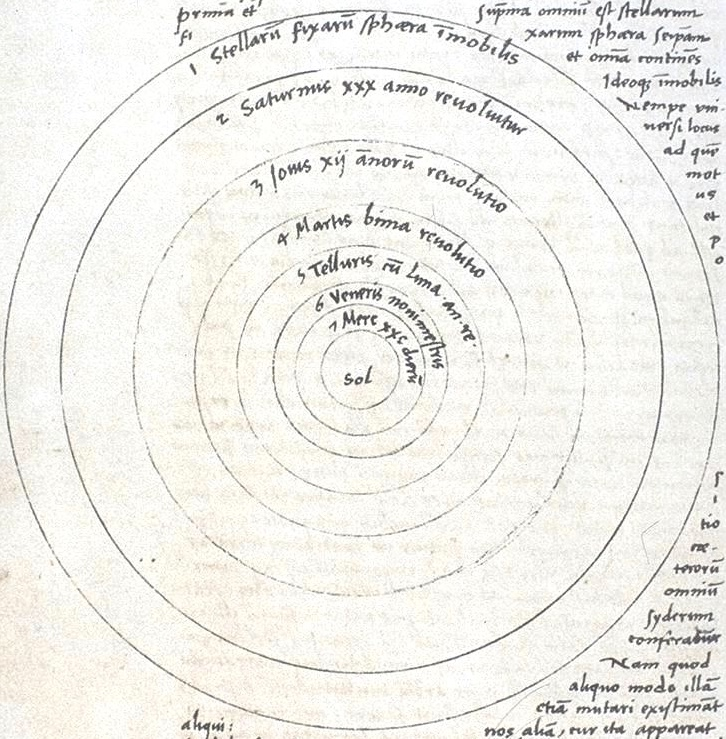
As it appears in the surviving autograph manuscript

As it appears in the first printed edition

Copernicus described his astronomical model in Dē revolutionibus orbium coelestium (On the Revolutions of the Celestial Spheres), published in the year of his death, 1543. He had formulated his theory by 1510. "He wrote out a short overview of his new heavenly arrangement [known as the Commentariolus, or Brief Sketch], also probably in 1510 [but no later than May 1514], and sent it off to at least one correspondent beyond Varmia [the Latin for "Warmia"]. That person in turn copied the document for further circulation, and presumably the new recipients did, too ...".

Copernicus's Commentariolus summarized his heliocentric theory. It listed the "assumptions" upon which the theory was based, as follows:

1. There is no one center of all the celestial circles or spheres.
2. The center of the earth is not the center of the universe, but only the center towards which heavy bodies move and the center of the lunar sphere.
3. All the spheres surround the sun as if it were in the middle of them all, and therefore the center of the universe is near the sun.
4. The ratio of the earth's distance from the sun to the height of the firmament (outermost celestial sphere containing the stars) is so much smaller than the ratio of the earth's radius to its distance from the sun that the distance from the earth to the sun is imperceptible in comparison with the height of the firmament.
5. Whatever motion appears in the firmament arises not from any motion of the firmament, but from the earth's motion. The earth together with its circumjacent elements performs a complete rotation on its fixed poles in a daily motion, while the firmament and highest heaven abide unchanged.
6. What appear to us as motions of the sun arise not from its motion but from the motion of the earth and our sphere, with which we revolve about the sun like any other planet. The earth has, then, more than one motion.
7. The apparent retrograde and direct motion of the planets arises not from their motion but from the earth's. The motion of the earth alone, therefore, suffices to explain so many apparent inequalities in the heavens.

De revolutionibus itself was divided into six sections or parts, called "books":

1. General vision of the heliocentric theory, and a summarized exposition of his idea of the World
2. Mainly theoretical, presents the principles of spherical astronomy and a list of stars (as a basis for the arguments developed in the subsequent books)
3. Mainly dedicated to the apparent motions of the Sun and to related phenomena
4. Description of the Moon and its orbital motions
5. Exposition of the motions in longitude of the non-terrestrial planets
6. Exposition of the motions in latitude of the non-terrestrial planets

=== Successors ===
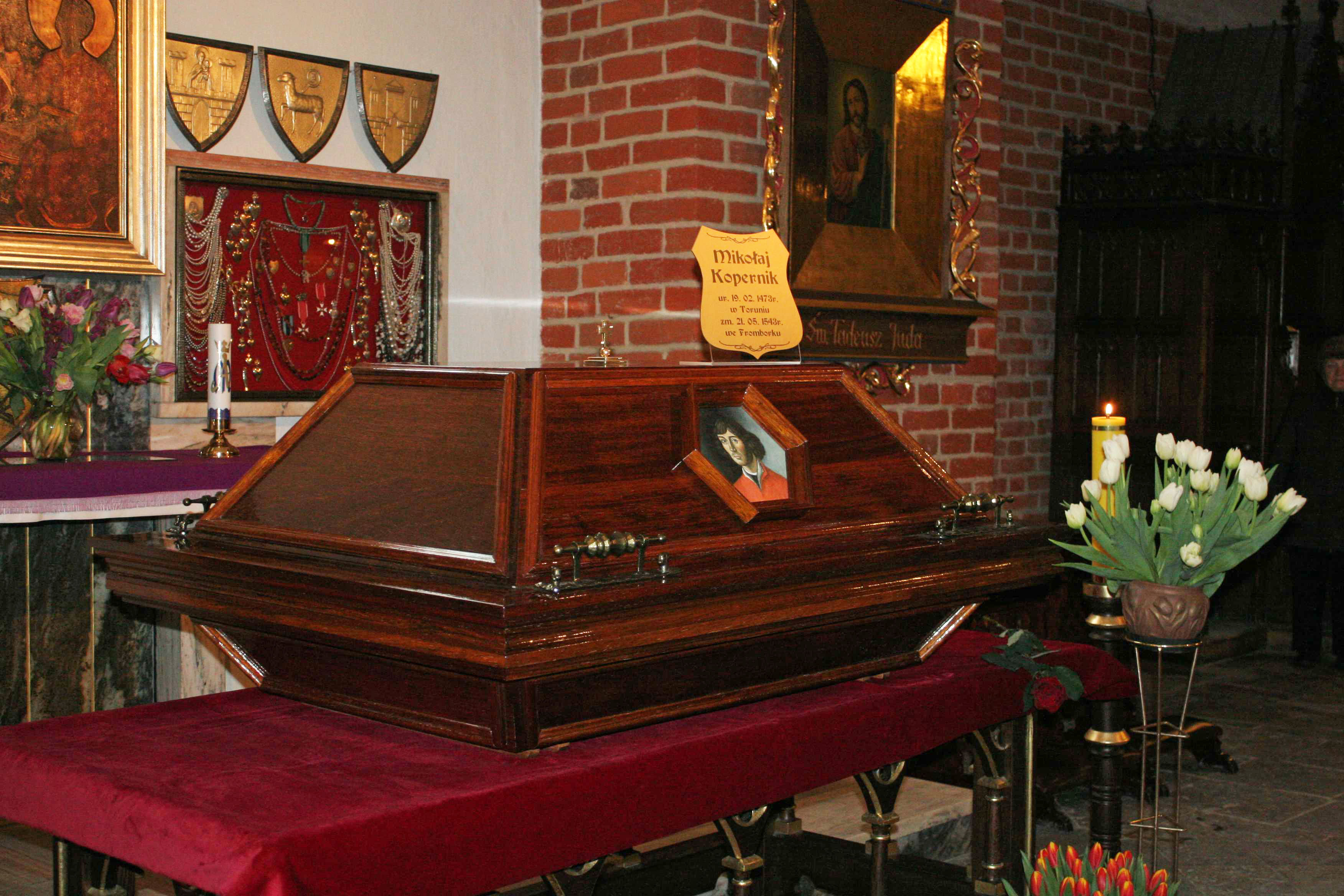
Casket with Copernicus's remains on exhibit in Olsztyn

Georg Joachim Rheticus could have been Copernicus's successor, but did not rise to the occasion. Erasmus Reinhold could have been his successor, but died prematurely. The first of the great successors was Tycho Brahe (though he did not think the Earth orbited the Sun), followed by Johannes Kepler, who had collaborated with Tycho in Prague and benefited from Tycho's decades' worth of detailed observational data.

Despite the near universal acceptance later of the heliocentric idea (though not the epicycles or the circular orbits), Copernicus's theory was originally slow to catch on. Scholars hold that sixty years after the publication of The Revolutions there were only around 15 astronomers espousing Copernicanism in all of Europe: "Thomas Digges and Thomas Harriot in England; Giordano Bruno and Galileo Galilei in Italy; Diego Zuniga in Spain; Simon Stevin in the Low Countries; and in Germany, the largest group—Georg Joachim Rheticus, Michael Maestlin, Christoph Rothmann (who may have later recanted), and Johannes Kepler." Additional possibilities are Englishman William Gilbert, along with Achilles Gasser, Georg Vogelin, Valentin Otto, and Tiedemann Giese. The Barnabite priest Redento Baranzano supported Copernicus's view in his Uranoscopia (1617) but was forced to retract it.

Arthur Koestler, in his popular book The Sleepwalkers, asserted that Copernicus's book had not been widely read on its first publication. This claim was trenchantly criticised by Edward Rosen, (Note: Rosen (1995, pp. 187–92), originally published in 1967 in Saggi su Galileo Galilei . Rosen is particularly scathing about this and other statements in The Sleepwalkers, which he criticizes as inaccurate.) and has been decisively disproved by Owen Gingerich, who examined nearly every surviving copy of the first two editions and found copious marginal notes by their owners throughout many of them. Gingerich published his conclusions in 2004 in The Book Nobody Read.

The intellectual climate of the time "remained dominated by Aristotelian philosophy and the corresponding Ptolemaic astronomy. At that time there was no reason to accept the Copernican theory, except for its mathematical simplicity [by avoiding using the equant in determining planetary positions]." Tycho Brahe's system ("that the earth is stationary, the sun revolves about the earth, and the other planets revolve about the sun") also directly competed with Copernicus's. It was only a half-century later with the work of Kepler and Galileo that any substantial evidence defending Copernicanism appeared, starting "from the time when Galileo formulated the principle of inertia ... [which] helped to explain why everything would not fall off the earth if it were in motion." "[Not until] after Isaac Newton formulated the universal law of gravitation and the laws of mechanics [in his 1687 Principia], which unified terrestrial and celestial mechanics, was the heliocentric view generally accepted."

In 1610 Galileo Galilei observed with his telescope that Venus showed phases, despite remaining near the Sun in Earth's sky (first image). This proved that, as predicted by Copernicus's heliocentric model, Venus orbits the Sun and not Earth, and disproved the then conventional geocentric model (second image).

== Controversy ==
The immediate result of the 1543 publication of Copernicus's book was only mild controversy. At the Council of Trent (1545–1563) neither Copernicus's theory nor calendar reform (which would later use tables deduced from Copernicus's calculations) were discussed. It has been much debated why it was not until six decades after the publication of De revolutionibus that the Catholic Church took any official action against it, even the efforts of Tolosani going unheeded. Catholic side opposition only commenced seventy-three years later, when it was occasioned by Galileo.

=== Tolosani ===
The first notable to move against Copernicanism was the Magister of the Holy Palace (i.e., the Catholic Church's chief censor), Dominican Bartolomeo Spina, who "expressed a desire to stamp out the Copernican doctrine". But with Spina's death in 1546, his cause fell to his friend, the well-known theologian-astronomer, the Dominican Giovanni Maria Tolosani of the Convent of St. Mark in Florence. Tolosani had written a treatise on reforming the calendar (in which astronomy would play a large role) and had attended the Fifth Lateran Council (1512–1517) to discuss the matter. He had obtained a copy of De Revolutionibus in 1544. His denunciation of Copernicanism was written a year later, in 1545, in an appendix to his unpublished work, On the Truth of Sacred Scripture.

Emulating the rationalistic style of Thomas Aquinas, Tolosani sought to refute Copernicanism by philosophical argument. Copernicanism was absurd, according to Tolosani, because it was scientifically unproven and unfounded. First, Copernicus had assumed the motion of the Earth but offered no physical theory whereby one would deduce this motion. (No one realized that the investigation into Copernicanism would result in a rethinking of the entire field of physics.) Second, Tolosani charged that Copernicus's thought process was backwards. He held that Copernicus had come up with his idea and then sought phenomena that would support it, rather than observing phenomena and deducing from them the idea of what caused them. In this, Tolosani was linking Copernicus's mathematical equations with the practices of the Pythagoreans (whom Aristotle had made arguments against, which were later picked up by Thomas Aquinas). It was argued that mathematical numbers were a mere product of the intellect without any physical reality, and as such could not provide physical causes in the investigation of nature.

Some astronomical hypotheses at the time (such as epicycles and eccentrics) were seen as mere mathematical devices to adjust calculations of where the heavenly bodies would appear, rather than an explanation of the cause of those motions. (As Copernicus still maintained the idea of perfectly spherical orbits, he relied on epicycles.) This "saving the phenomena" was seen as proof that astronomy and mathematics could not be taken as serious means to determine physical causes. Tolosani invoked this view in his final critique of Copernicus, saying that his biggest error was that he had started with "inferior" fields of science to make pronouncements about "superior" fields. Copernicus had used mathematics and astronomy to postulate about physics and cosmology, rather than beginning with the accepted principles of physics and cosmology to determine things about astronomy and mathematics. Thus Copernicus seemed to be undermining the whole system of the philosophy of science at the time. Tolosani held that Copernicus had fallen into philosophical error because he had not been versed in physics and logic; anyone without such knowledge would make a poor astronomer and be unable to distinguish truth from falsehood. Because Copernicanism had not met the criteria for scientific truth set out by Thomas Aquinas, Tolosani held that it could only be viewed as a wild unproven theory.

Tolosani recognized that the Ad Lectorem preface to Copernicus's book was not actually by him. Its thesis that astronomy as a whole would never be able to make truth claims was rejected by Tolosani (though he still held that Copernicus's attempt to describe physical reality had been faulty); he found it ridiculous that Ad Lectorem had been included in the book (unaware that Copernicus had not authorized its inclusion). Tolosani wrote: "By means of these words [of the Ad Lectorem], the foolishness of this book's author is rebuked. For by a foolish effort he [Copernicus] tried to revive the weak Pythagorean opinion [that the element of fire was at the center of the Universe], long ago deservedly destroyed, since it is expressly contrary to human reason and also opposes holy writ. From this situation, there could easily arise disagreements between Catholic expositors of holy scripture and those who might wish to adhere obstinately to this false opinion." Tolosani declared: "Nicolaus Copernicus neither read nor understood the arguments of Aristotle the philosopher and Ptolemy the astronomer." Tolosani wrote that Copernicus "is expert indeed in the sciences of mathematics and astronomy, but he is very deficient in the sciences of physics and logic. Moreover, it appears that he is unskilled with regard to [the interpretation of] holy scripture, since he contradicts several of its principles, not without danger of infidelity to himself and the readers of his book. ... his arguments have no force and can very easily be taken apart. For it is stupid to contradict an opinion accepted by everyone over a very long time for the strongest reasons, unless the impugner uses more powerful and insoluble demonstrations and completely dissolves the opposed reasons. But he does not do this in the least."

Tolosani declared that he had written against Copernicus "for the purpose of preserving the truth to the common advantage of the Holy Church." Despite this, his work remained unpublished and there is no evidence that it received serious consideration. Robert Westman describes it as becoming a "dormant" viewpoint with "no audience in the Catholic world" of the late sixteenth century, but also notes that there is some evidence that it did become known to Tommaso Caccini, who would criticize Galileo in a sermon in December 1613.

=== Theology ===
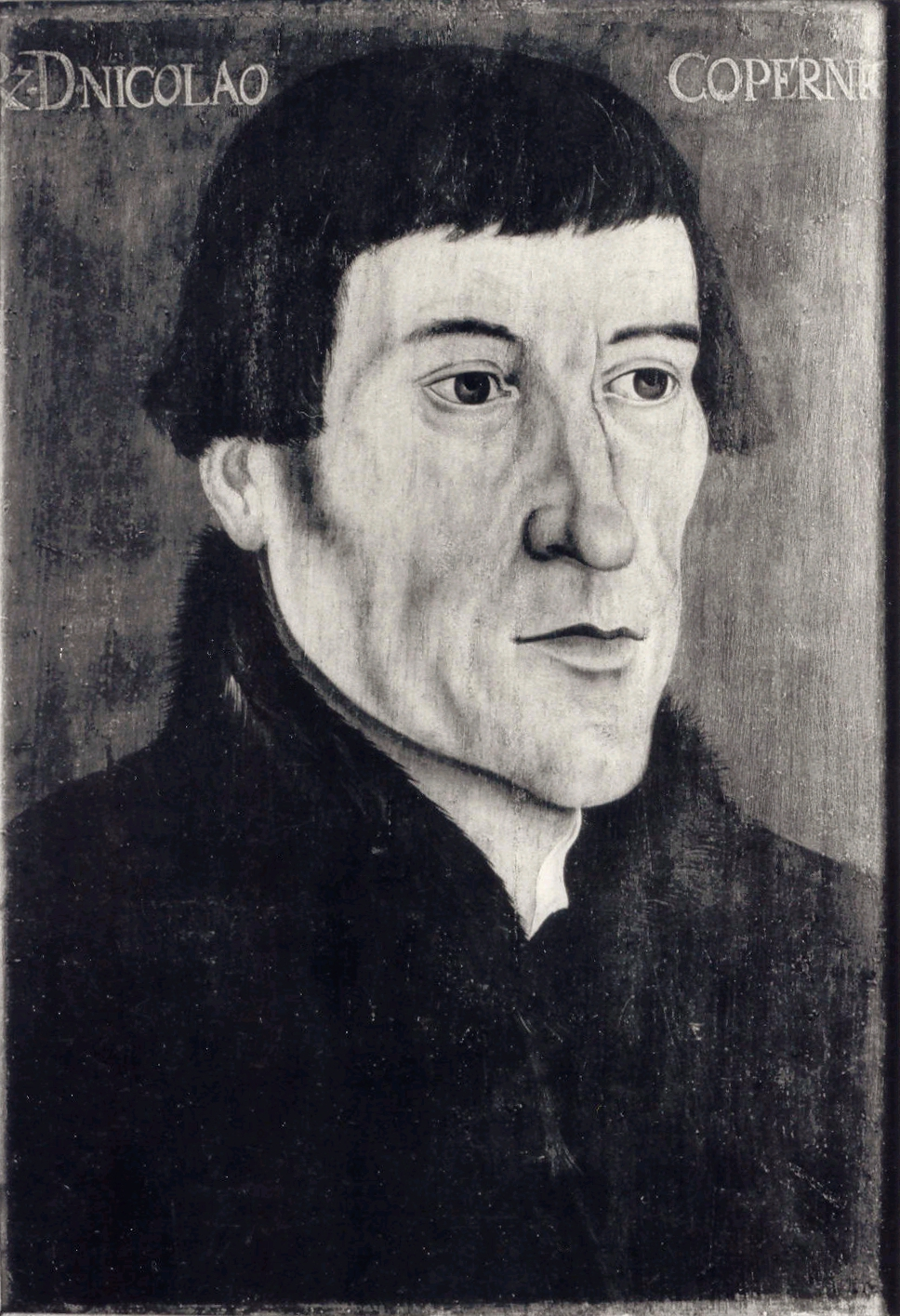
Photo of a mid-16th-century portrait (Note: The original painting was looted, possibly destroyed, by the Germans in World War II during their occupation of Poland.)

Tolosani may have criticized the Copernican theory as scientifically unproven and unfounded, but the theory also conflicted with the theology of the time, as can be seen in a sample of the works of John Calvin. In his Commentary on Genesis he said that "We indeed are not ignorant that the circuit of the heavens is finite, and that the earth, like a little globe, is placed in the centre." In his commentary on Psalms 93:1 he states that "The heavens revolve daily, and, immense as is their fabric and inconceivable the rapidity of their revolutions, we experience no concussion ... How could the earth hang suspended in the air were it not upheld by God's hand? By what means could it maintain itself unmoved, while the heavens above are in constant rapid motion, did not its Divine Maker fix and establish it." One sharp point of conflict between Copernicus's theory and the Bible concerned the story of the Battle of Gibeon in the Book of Joshua where the Hebrew forces were winning but whose opponents were likely to escape once night fell. This is averted by Joshua's prayers causing the Sun and the Moon to stand still. Martin Luther once made a remark about Copernicus, although without mentioning his name. According to Anthony Lauterbach, while eating with Martin Luther the topic of Copernicus arose during dinner on 4 June 1539 (in the same year as professor George Joachim Rheticus of the local University had been granted leave to visit him). Luther is said to have remarked "So it goes now. Whoever wants to be clever must agree with nothing others esteem. He must do something of his own. This is what that fellow does who wishes to turn the whole of astronomy upside down. Even in these things that are thrown into disorder I believe the Holy Scriptures, for Joshua commanded the sun to stand still and not the earth." These remarks were made four years before the publication of On the Revolutions of the Heavenly Spheres and a year before Rheticus's Narratio Prima. In John Aurifaber's account of the conversation Luther calls Copernicus "that fool" rather than "that fellow", this version is viewed by historians as less reliably sourced.

Luther's collaborator Philipp Melanchthon also took issue with Copernicanism. After receiving the first pages of Narratio Prima from Rheticus himself, Melanchthon wrote to Mithobius (physician and mathematician Burkard Mithob of Feldkirch) on 16 October 1541 condemning the theory and calling for it to be repressed by governmental force, writing "certain people believe it is a marvelous achievement to extol so crazy a thing, like that Polish astronomer who makes the earth move and the sun stand still. Really, wise governments ought to repress impudence of mind." It had appeared to Rheticus that Melanchton would understand the theory and would be open to it. This was because Melanchton had taught Ptolemaic astronomy and had even recommended his friend Rheticus to an appointment to the Deanship of the Faculty of Arts & Sciences at the University of Wittenberg after he had returned from studying with Copernicus.

Rheticus's hopes were dashed when six years after the publication of De Revolutionibus Melanchthon published his Initia Doctrinae Physicae presenting three grounds to reject Copernicanism. These were "the evidence of the senses, the thousand-year consensus of men of science, and the authority of the Bible". Blasting the new theory Melanchthon wrote, "Out of love for novelty or in order to make a show of their cleverness, some people have argued that the earth moves. They maintain that neither the eighth sphere nor the sun moves, whereas they attribute motion to the other celestial spheres, and also place the earth among the heavenly bodies. Nor were these jokes invented recently. There is still extant Archimedes's book on The Sand Reckoner; in which he reports that Aristarchus of Samos propounded the paradox that the sun stands still and the earth revolves around the sun. Even though subtle experts institute many investigations for the sake of exercising their ingenuity, nevertheless public proclamation of absurd opinions is indecent and sets a harmful example." Melanchthon went on to cite Bible passages and then declare "Encouraged by this divine evidence, let us cherish the truth and let us not permit ourselves to be alienated from it by the tricks of those who deem it an intellectual honor to introduce confusion into the arts." In the first edition of Initia Doctrinae Physicae, Melanchthon even questioned Copernicus's character claiming his motivation was "either from love of novelty or from desire to appear clever", these more personal attacks were largely removed by the second edition in 1550.

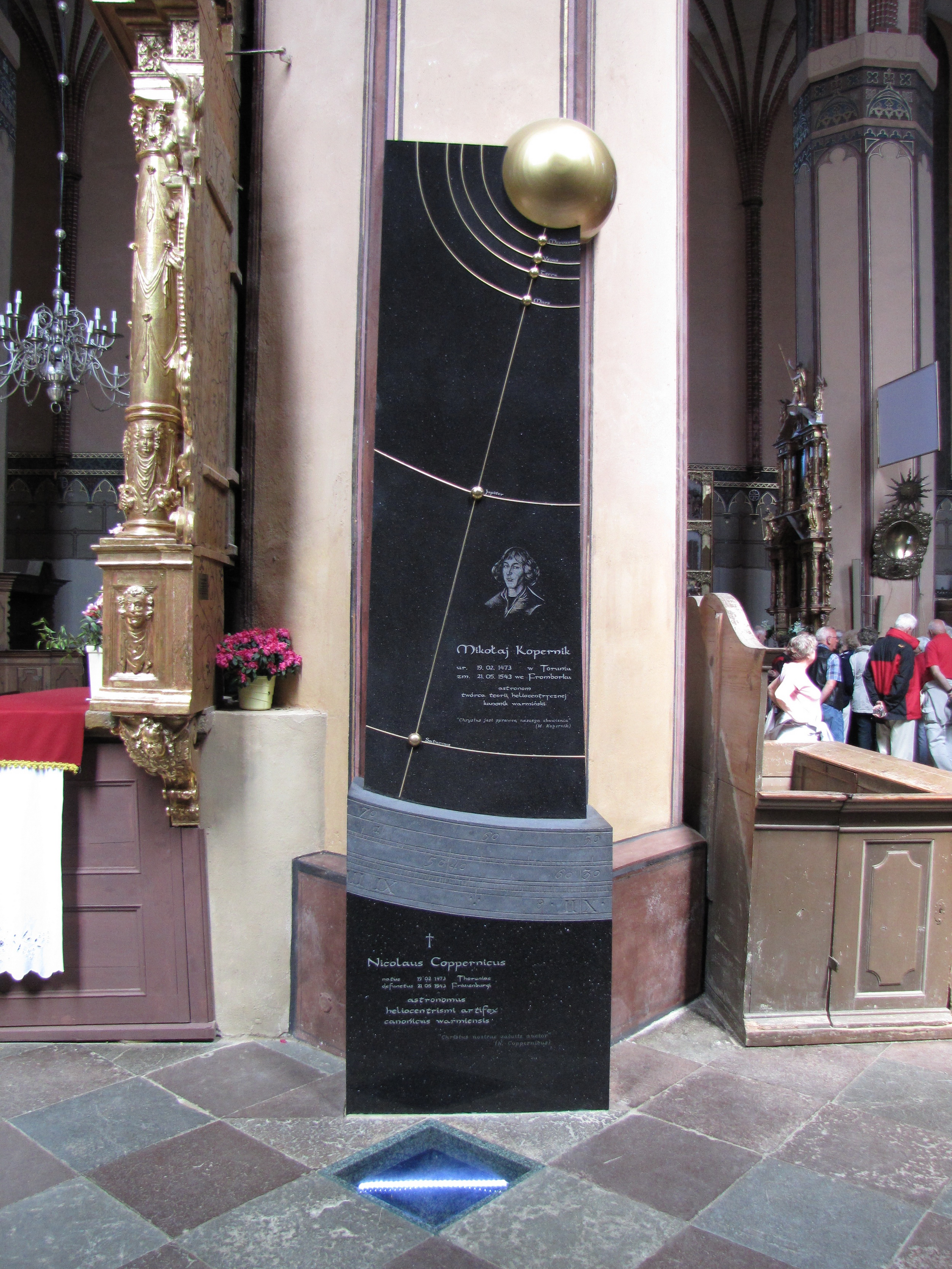
Copernicus's 2010 gravestone in Frombork Cathedral

Another Protestant theologian who disparaged heliocentrism on scriptural grounds was John Owen. In a passing remark in an essay on the origin of the sabbath, he characterised "the late hypothesis, fixing the sun as in the centre of the world" as being "built on fallible phenomena, and advanced by many arbitrary presumptions against evident testimonies of Scripture."

In Roman Catholic circles, Copernicus's book was incorporated into scholarly curricula throughout the 16th century. For example, at the University of Salamanca in 1561 it became one of four text books that students of astronomy could choose from, and in 1594 it was made mandatory. German Jesuit Nicolaus Serarius was one of the first Catholics to write against Copernicus's theory as heretical, citing the Joshua passage, in a work published in 1609–1610, and again in a book in 1612. In his 12 April 1615 letter to a Catholic defender of Copernicus, Paolo Antonio Foscarini, Catholic Cardinal Robert Bellarmine condemned Copernican theory, writing, "not only the Holy Fathers, but also the modern commentaries on Genesis, the Psalms, Ecclesiastes, and Joshua, you will find all agreeing in the literal interpretation that the sun is in heaven and turns around the earth with great speed, and that the earth is very far from heaven and sits motionless at the center of the world ... Nor can one answer that this is not a matter of faith, since if it is not a matter of faith 'as regards the topic,' it is a matter of faith 'as regards the speaker': and so it would be heretical to say that Abraham did not have two children and Jacob twelve, as well as to say that Christ was not born of a virgin, because both are said by the Holy Spirit through the mouth of prophets and apostles." One year later, the Roman Inquisition prohibited Copernicus's work. Nevertheless, the Spanish Inquisition never banned the De revolutionibus, which continued to be taught at Salamanca.

=== Ingoli ===
Perhaps the most influential opponent of the Copernican theory was Francesco Ingoli, a Catholic priest. Ingoli wrote a January 1616 essay to Galileo presenting more than twenty arguments against the Copernican theory. Though "it is not certain, it is probable that he [Ingoli] was commissioned by the Inquisition to write an expert opinion on the controversy", (after the Congregation of the Index's decree against Copernicanism on 5 March 1616, Ingoli was officially appointed its consultant). Galileo himself was of the opinion that the essay played an important role in the rejection of the theory by church authorities, writing in a later letter to Ingoli that he was concerned that people thought the theory was rejected because Ingoli was right. Ingoli presented five physical arguments against the theory, thirteen mathematical arguments (plus a separate discussion of the sizes of stars), and four theological arguments. The physical and mathematical arguments were of uneven quality, but many of them came directly from the writings of Tycho Brahe, and Ingoli repeatedly cited Brahe, the leading astronomer of the era. These included arguments about the effect of a moving Earth on the trajectory of projectiles, and about parallax and Brahe's argument that the Copernican theory required that stars be absurdly large.

Two of Ingoli's theological issues with the Copernican theory were "common Catholic beliefs not directly traceable to Scripture: the doctrine that hell is located at the center of Earth and is most distant from heaven; and the explicit assertion that Earth is motionless in a hymn sung on Tuesdays as part of the Liturgy of the Hours of the Divine Office prayers regularly recited by priests." Ingoli cited Robert Bellarmine in regards to both of these arguments, and may have been trying to convey to Galileo a sense of Bellarmine's opinion. Ingoli also cited Genesis 1:14 where God places "lights in the firmament of the heavens to divide the day from the night." Ingoli did not think the central location of the Sun in the Copernican theory was compatible with it being described as one of the lights placed in the firmament. Like previous commentators Ingoli also pointed to the passages about the Battle of Gibeon. He dismissed arguments that they should be taken metaphorically, saying "Replies which assert that Scripture speaks according to our mode of understanding are not satisfactory: both because in explaining the Sacred Writings the rule is always to preserve the literal sense, when it is possible, as it is in this case; and also because all the [Church] Fathers unanimously take this passage to mean that the Sun which was truly moving stopped at Joshua's request. An interpretation that is contrary to the unanimous consent of the Fathers is condemned by the Council of Trent, Session IV, in the decree on the edition and use of the Sacred Books. Furthermore, although the Council speaks about matters of faith and morals, nevertheless it cannot be denied that the Holy Fathers would be displeased with an interpretation of Sacred Scriptures which is contrary to their common agreement." However, Ingoli closed the essay by suggesting Galileo respond primarily to the better of his physical and mathematical arguments rather than to his theological arguments, writing "Let it be your choice to respond to this either entirely of in part—clearly at least to the mathematical and physical arguments, and not to all even of these, but to the more weighty ones." When Galileo wrote a letter in reply to Ingoli years later, he in fact only addressed the mathematical and physical arguments.

In March 1616, in connection with the Galileo affair, the Roman Catholic Church's Congregation of the Index issued a decree suspending De revolutionibus until it could be "corrected", on the grounds of ensuring that Copernicanism, which it described as a "false Pythagorean doctrine, altogether contrary to the Holy Scripture," would not "creep any further to the prejudice of Catholic truth." The corrections consisted largely of removing or altering wording that spoke of heliocentrism as a fact, rather than a hypothesis. The corrections were made based largely on work by Ingoli.

=== Galileo ===
On the orders of Pope Paul V, Cardinal Robert Bellarmine gave Galileo prior notice that the decree was about to be issued, and warned him that he could not "hold or defend" the Copernican doctrine. (Note: Fantoli (2005, pp. 118–19); Finocchiaro (1989, pp. 148, 153). On-line copies of Finocchiaro's translations of the relevant documents, Inquisition Minutes of 25 February 1616 and Cardinal Bellarmine's certificate of 26 May 1616, have been made available by Gagné (2005). This notice of the decree would not have prevented Galileo from discussing heliocentrism solely as a mathematical hypothesis, but a stronger formal injunction (Finocchiaro, 1989, pp. 147–48) not to teach it "in any way whatever, either orally or in writing", allegedly issued to him by the Commissary of the Holy Office, Father Michelangelo Segizzi, would certainly have done so (Fantoli, 2005, pp. 119–20, 137). There has been much controversy over whether the copy of this injunction in the Vatican archives is authentic; if so, whether it was ever issued; and if so, whether it was legally valid (Fantoli, 2005, pp. 120–43).) The corrections to De revolutionibus, which omitted or altered nine sentences, were issued four years later, in 1620.

In 1633, Galileo Galilei was convicted of grave suspicion of heresy for "following the position of Copernicus, which is contrary to the true sense and authority of Holy Scripture", and was placed under house arrest for the rest of his life.

At the instance of Roger Boscovich, the Catholic Church's 1758 Index of Prohibited Books omitted the general prohibition of works defending heliocentrism, but retained the specific prohibitions of the original uncensored versions of De revolutionibus and Galileo's Dialogue Concerning the Two Chief World Systems. Those prohibitions were finally dropped from the 1835 Index.

== Languages, name, and nationality ==
=== Languages ===
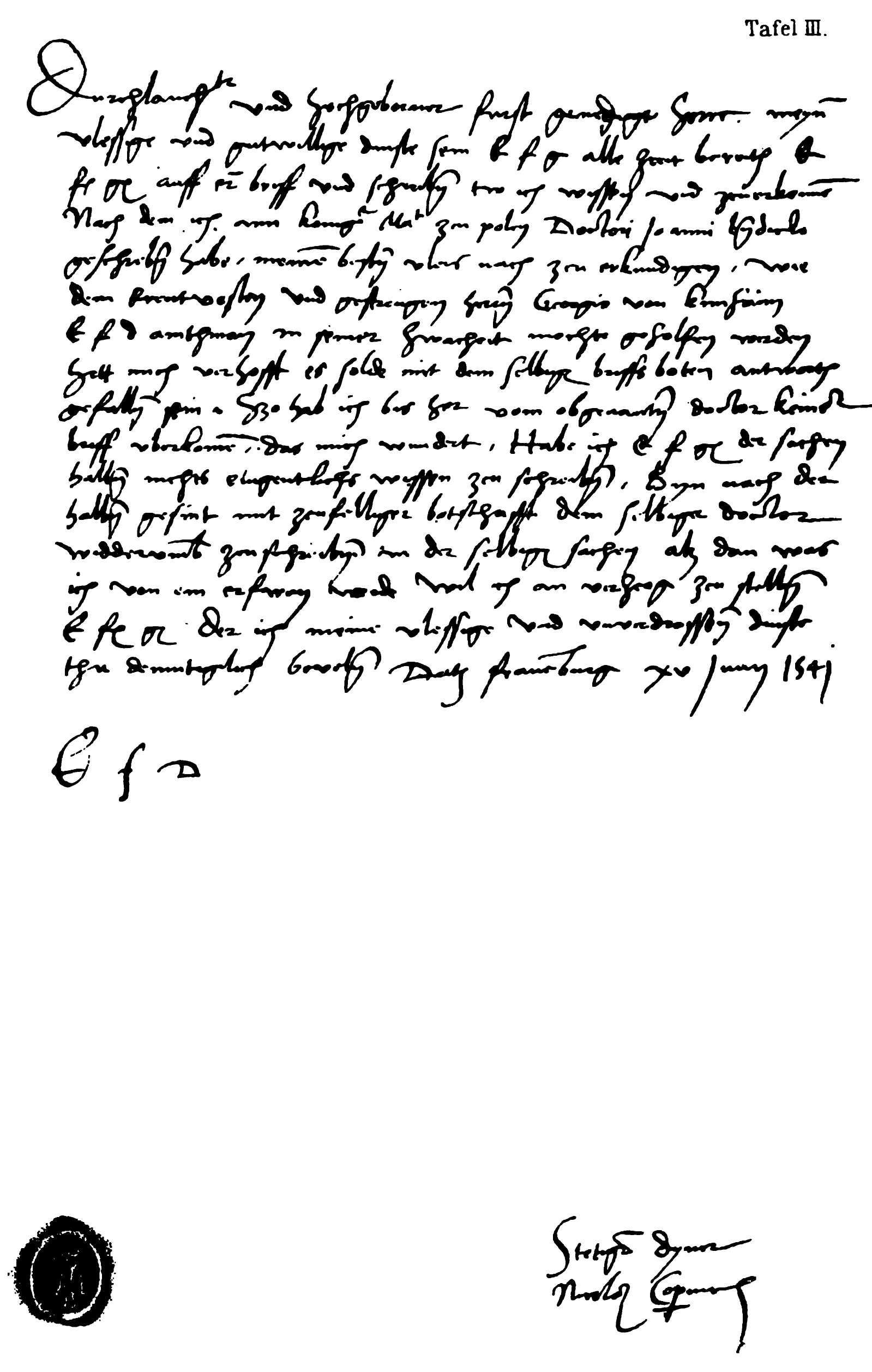
1541 German-language letter from Copernicus to Duke Albert of Prussia, giving medical advice for Georg von Kunheim

Copernicus's mother tongue was German and he almost certainly spoke it at home. Arguments for German being Copernicus's native tongue are that he was born into a predominantly German-speaking urban patrician class using German, next to Latin, as language of trade and commerce in written documents, and that, while studying canon law at the University of Bologna in 1496, he signed into the German natio (Natio Germanorum)—a student organization which, according to its 1497 by-laws, was open to students of all kingdoms and states whose mother tongue was German. He wrote most of his surviving works in Latin, the principal language of European scholarship in his time, and also used German in correspondence.

Copernicus may also have spoken Polish, although the evidence for his knowledge of the language is indirect. According to Norman Davies "there is ample evidence that he knew the Polish language." Edward Rosen mentions that Copernicus recorded Polish farm tenants' names inconsistently, gainsaying that he was fluent in the Polish language. No letters written by him in Polish are known to survive, and the extent of his proficiency remains uncertain. He also acquired sufficient knowledge of Greek to translate a collection of letters by Theophylact Simocatta into Latin. Copernicus may also have acquired some knowledge of Italian during his years of study in Italy, although the extent of his proficiency is unknown.

=== Name ===
The surname Kopernik, Copernik, Koppernigk, in various spellings, is recorded in Kraków from c. 1350, apparently given to people from the village of Koperniki (prior to 1845 rendered Kopernik, Copernik, Copirnik, and Koppirnik) in the Duchy of Nysa, 10 km south of Nysa, and now 10 km north of the Polish-Czech border. Nicolaus Copernicus's great-grandfather is recorded as having received citizenship in Kraków in 1386. The toponym Kopernik (modern Koperniki) has been variously tied to the Polish word for "dill" (koper) and the German word for "copper" (Kupfer). (Note: These interpretations date to the dispute about Copernicus's (Polish vs. German) ethnicity, which had been open since the 1870s, and the "copper" vs. "dill" interpretations go back to the 19th century (Magazin für die Literatur des Auslandes, 1875, 534 f), but the dispute became virulent again in the 1960s, culminating in a controversy between E. Mosko ("copper") and S. Rospond ("dill") in 1963–64, summarized by Zygmunt Brocki, "Wśród publikacji o etymologii nazwiska Mikołaja Kopernika ["Among the publications on the etymology of the name of Nicholas Copernicus"], Komunikaty mazur.-warm., 1970.) The suffix -nik (or plural, -niki) denotes a Slavic and Polish agent noun.

As was common in the period, the spellings of both the toponym and the surname vary greatly. Copernicus "was rather indifferent about orthography". During his childhood, about 1480, the name of his father (and thus of the future astronomer) was recorded in Thorn as Niclas Koppernigk. At Kraków he signed himself, in Latin, Nicolaus Nicolai de Torunia (Nicolaus, son of Nicolaus, of Toruń). (Note: "In the [enrollment] documents still in existence we find the entry: Nicolaus Nicolai de Torunia.") At Bologna, in 1496, he registered in the Matricula Nobilissimi Germanorum Collegii, resp. Annales Clarissimae Nacionis Germanorum, of the Natio Germanica Bononiae, as Dominus Nicolaus Kopperlingk de Thorn – IX grosseti. At Padua he signed himself "Nicolaus Copernik", later "Coppernicus". The astronomer thus Latinized his name to Coppernicus, generally with two "p"s (in 23 of 31 documents studied), but later in life he used a single "p". On the title page of De revolutionibus, Rheticus published the name (in the genitive, or possessive, case) as "Nicolai Copernici".

=== Nationality ===
There has been discussion of Copernicus's nationality and of whether it is meaningful to ascribe to him a nationality in the modern sense.

Nicolaus Copernicus was born and raised in Royal Prussia, a semi-autonomous and multilingual region of the Kingdom of Poland. He was the child of German-speaking parents and grew up with German as his mother tongue. His first alma mater was the University of Kraków in Poland. When he later studied in Italy, at the University of Bologna, he joined the German Nation, a student organization for German-speakers. His family stood against the Teutonic Order and actively supported the city of Thorn during the Thirteen Years' War. Copernicus's father lent money to the city of Thorn to finance the war against the Teutonic Knights and a bridge across the Vistula. The inhabitants of Royal Prussia also resisted the Polish crown's efforts for greater control over the region.

Sheila Rabin, writing in the Stanford Encyclopedia of Philosophy, describes Copernicus as a "child of a German family [who] was a subject of the Polish crown". Andrzej Wojtkowski noted that most of the 19th and 20th century encyclopedias, particularly the English-language sources, described Copernicus as a "German scientist". Kasparek and Kasparek stated that it is incorrect to ascribe him German or Polish nationality, as "a 16th century figure cannot be described with the use of 19th and 20th century concepts".

Historian Michael Burleigh describes the nationality debate as a "totally insignificant battle" between German and Polish scholars during the interwar period. Polish astronomer Konrad Rudnicki calls the discussion a "fierce scholarly quarrel in ... times of nationalism".

Czesław Miłosz describes the debate as an "absurd" projection of a modern understanding of nationality onto Renaissance people, who identified with their home territories rather than with a nation. Similarly, historian Norman Davies writes that Copernicus, as was common in his era, was "largely indifferent" to nationality, being a local patriot who considered himself "Prussian". Miłosz and Davies both write that Copernicus had a German-language cultural background, while his working language was Latin in accord with the usage of the time. Additionally, according to Davies, "there is ample evidence that he knew the Polish language". Davies concludes that, "Taking everything into consideration, there is good reason to regard him both as a German and as a Pole: and yet, in the sense that modern nationalists understand it, he was neither."

Historian William Urban takes a similar view, writing: "He was Polish in that he was born, educated, and lived in lands subject to the king of Poland; he was German in that Royal Prussia was a largely German-speaking region with historical ties to the Holy Roman Empire. In fact, Copernicus was neither wholly one nor the other: he was a Prussian, reared and living in a regional culture with traditions of its own."

== Commemoration ==
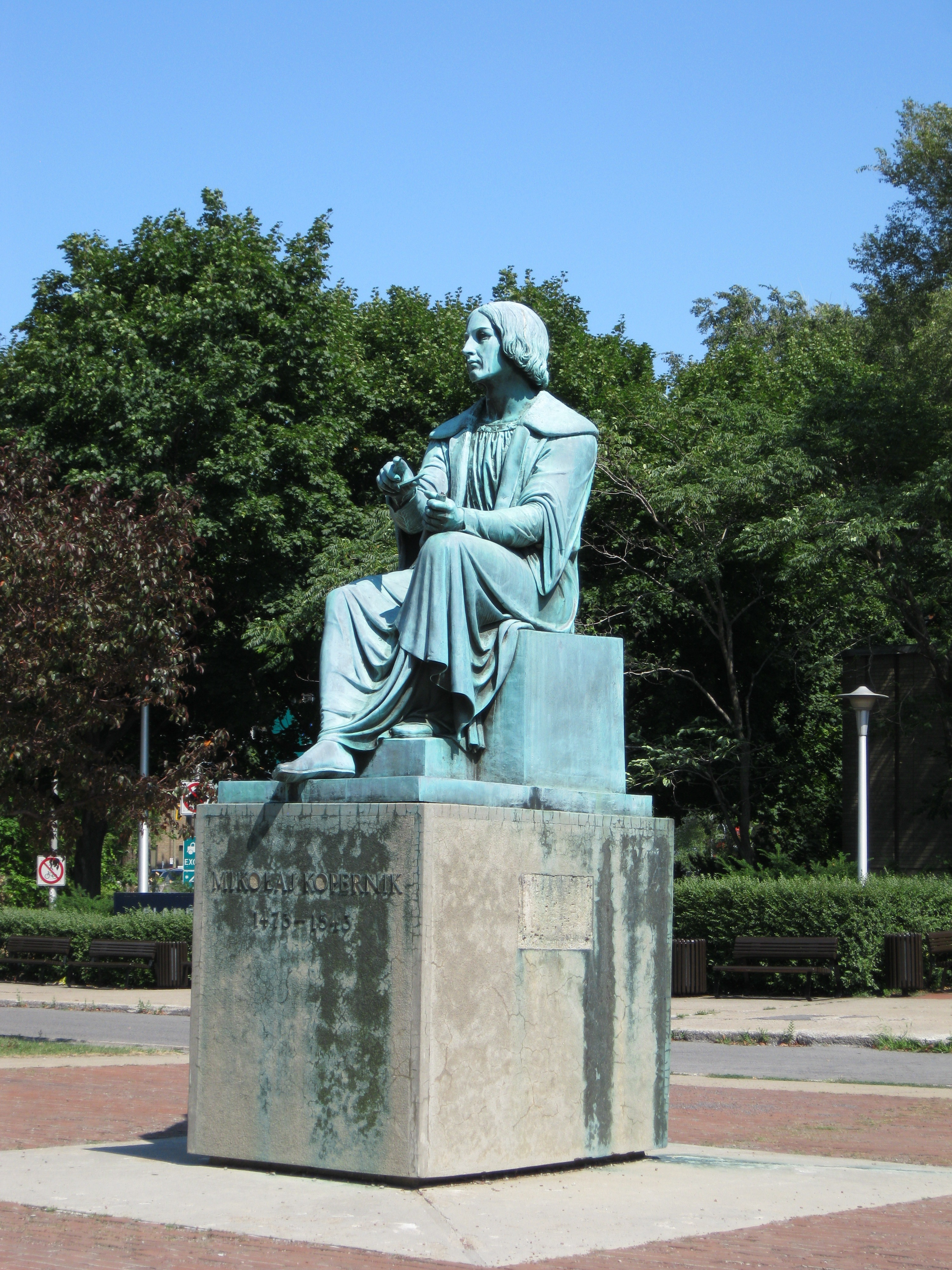
Replica of Warsaw's Copernicus Monument, in Montreal, Canada

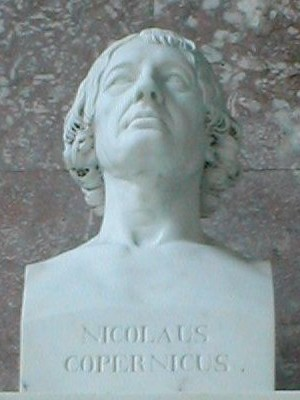
Bust by Schadow, 1807, in the Walhalla memorial

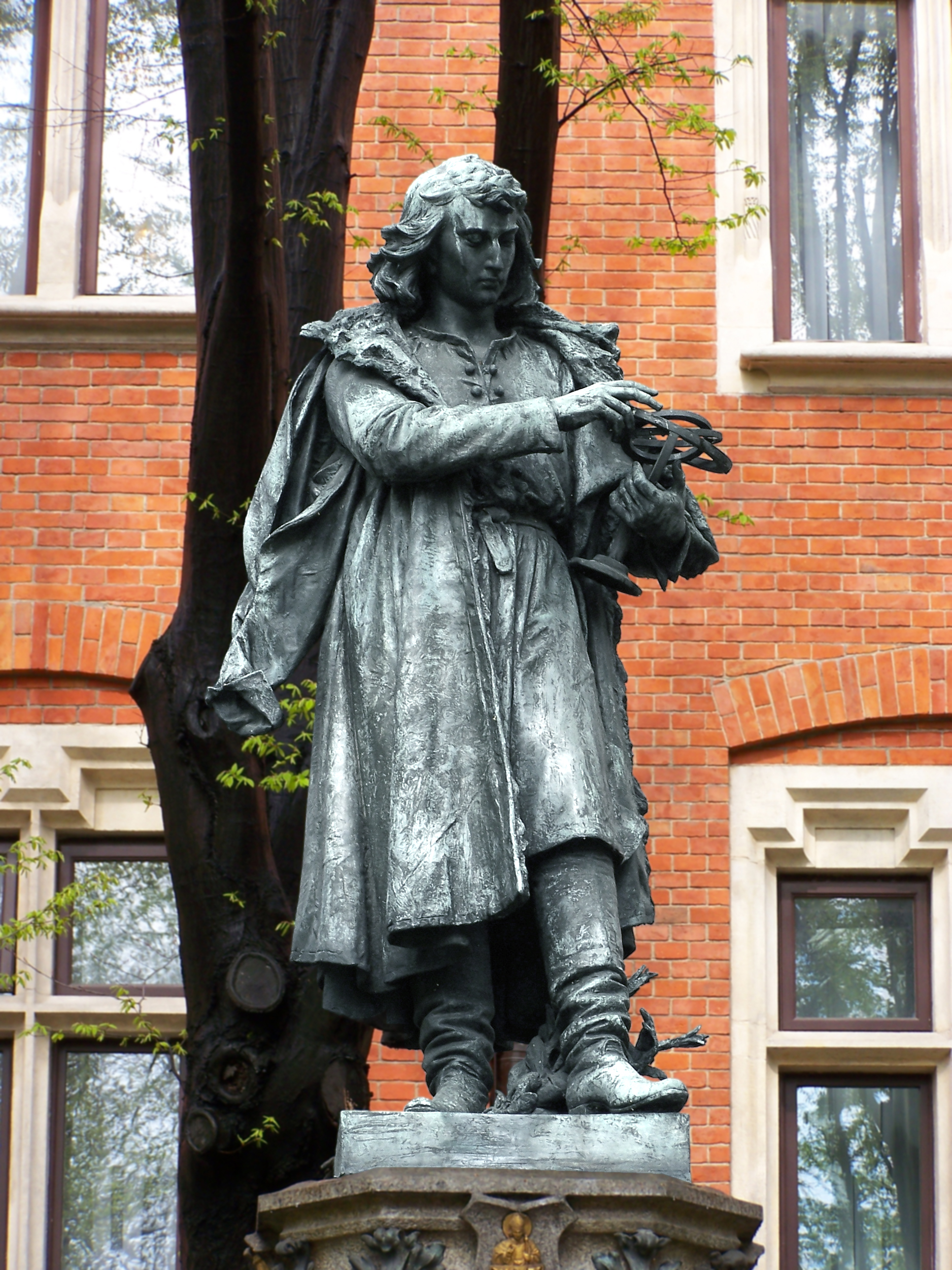
Nicolaus Copernicus Monument in Kraków

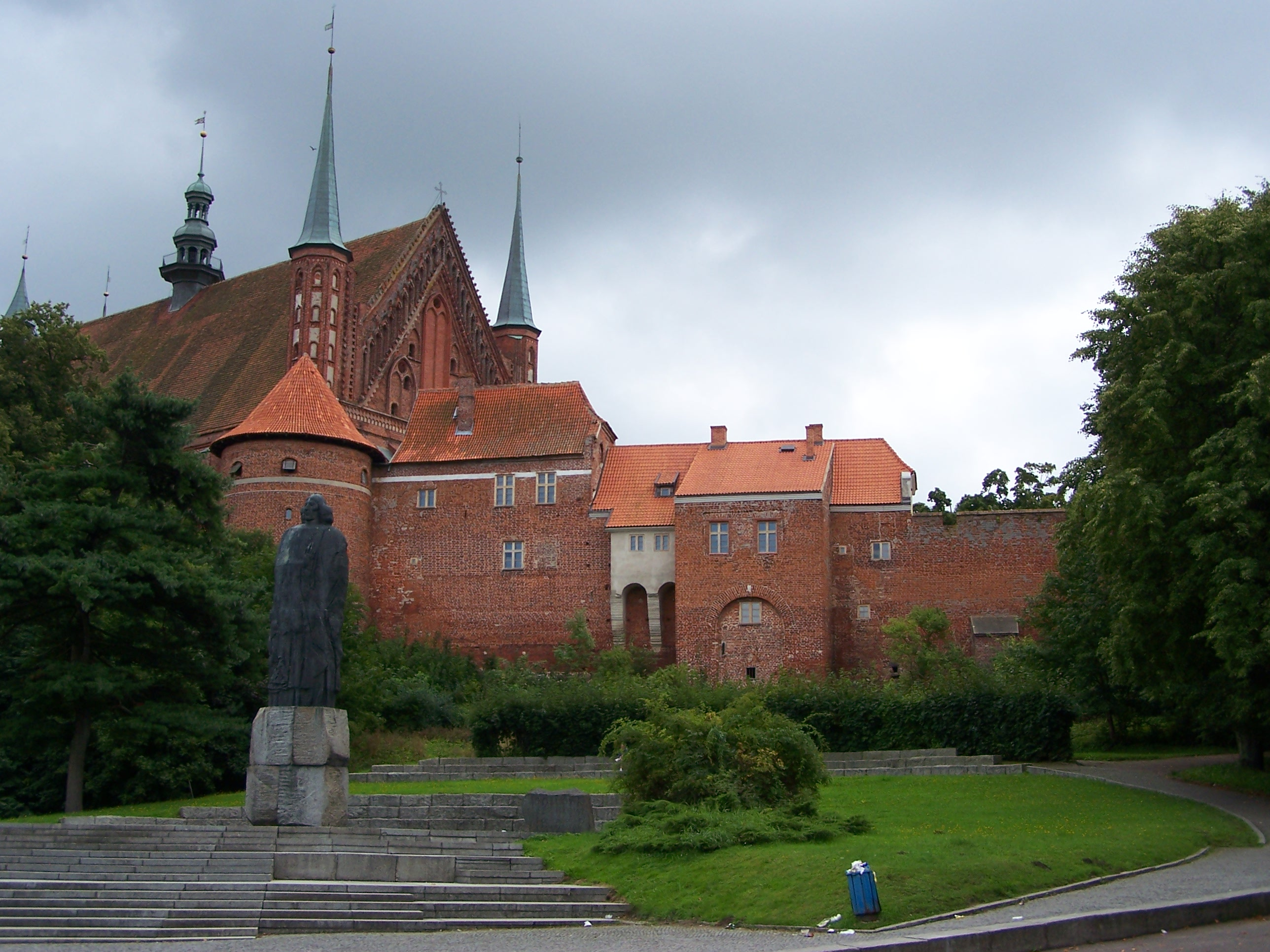
Copernicus statue before Frombork Cathedral

=== Orbiting Astronomical Observatory 3 ===
The third in NASA's Orbiting Astronomical Observatory series of missions, launched on 21 August 1972, was named Copernicus after its successful launch. The satellite carried an X-ray detector and an ultraviolet telescope, and operated until February 1981.

=== Copernicia ===
Copernicia, a genus of palm trees native to South America and the Greater Antilles, was named after Copernicus in 1837. In some of the species, the leaves are coated with a thin layer of wax, known as carnauba wax.

=== Copernicium ===
On 14 July 2009, the discoverers, from the Gesellschaft für Schwerionenforschung in Darmstadt, Germany, of chemical element 112 (temporarily named ununbium) proposed to the International Union of Pure and Applied Chemistry (IUPAC) that its permanent name be "copernicium" (symbol Cn). "After we had named elements after our city and our state, we wanted to make a statement with a name that was known to everyone," said Hofmann. "We didn't want to select someone who was a German. We were looking world-wide." On the 537th anniversary of his birthday the name became official.

=== 55 Cancri A ===
In July 2014 the International Astronomical Union launched NameExoWorlds, a process for giving proper names to certain exoplanets and their host stars. The process involved public nomination and voting for the new names. In December 2015, the IAU announced the winning name for 55 Cancri A was Copernicus.

=== Copernicus Gesellschaft ===
A German non-profit society founded in February 1988 at the Max Planck Institute for Aeronomy to promote international collaboration in the geo- and space sciences. The society supports open-access scientific publishing, organizes scientific conferences (including those of the European Geophysicists' Union and European Meteorological Society), and presents the Copernicus Medal for "ingenious, innovative work in the geosciences and planetary and space sciences, and in their exceptional promotion and international cooperation".

=== Poland ===
Copernicus is commemorated by the Nicolaus Copernicus Monument in Warsaw, designed by Bertel Thorvaldsen (1822), completed in 1830; and by Jan Matejko's 1873 painting, Astronomer Copernicus, or Conversations with God.

Named for Copernicus are Nicolaus Copernicus University in Toruń; Warsaw's Copernicus Science Centre, the Centrum Astronomiczne im. Mikołaja Kopernika (a principal Polish research institution in astrophysics), Copernicus Hospital in Poland's fourth largest city, Łódź, and the Wrocław Airport, Port lotniczy Wrocław im. Mikołaja Kopernika or in English: Nicolaus Copernicus Wrocław Airport.

=== In arts and literature ===
Contemporary literary and artistic works inspired by Copernicus include:

- Symphony No. 2 (Górecki), a choral symphony, by composer Henryk Górecki, commissioned by the Kosciuszko Foundation. The piece was composed in honor of the 500th anniversary of the birthday of Nicolaus Copernicus.
- Mover of the Earth, Stopper of the Sun, overture for symphony orchestra, by composer Svitlana Azarova, commissioned by ONDIF.
- Doctor Copernicus, 1975 novel by John Banville, sketching the life of Copernicus and the 16th-century world in which he lived.
- Orb: On the Movements of the Earth, a Japanese manga series from 2020, later adapted into anime.

== See also ==
- Copernican principle
- Copernicus Science Centre
- History of philosophy in Poland, Renaissance
- List of multiple discoveries
- List of Roman Catholic scientist-clerics
- Nicolaus Copernicus Astronomical Center of the Polish Academy of Sciences
