= Giovanni Maria Tolosani =

Italian theologian

Giovanni Maria Tolosani (pseudonym Joannes Lucidus Samotheus) (c.1471 – 22 January 1549) was an Italian theologian, writer, a prior of the Dominican order at the convent of St. Mark in Florence a mathematician and an astronomer. He is best known for writing the first notable denunciation of Copernican heliocentric theory in 1545.

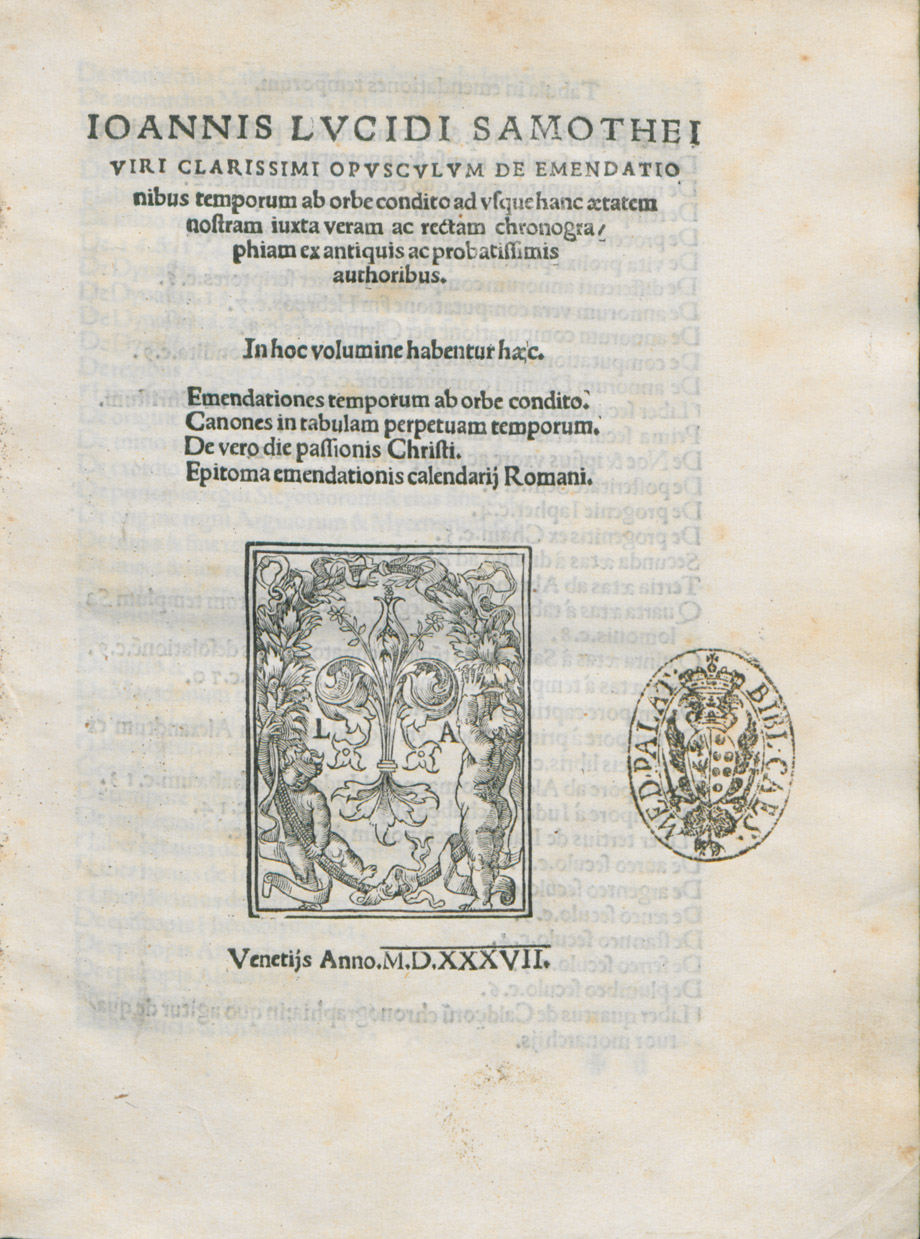
De emendationibus temporum, 1537

== Biography ==
Tolosani came from a Tuscan family based near Florence. He was born in Colle di Val d'Elsa. His father, Leonardo, was a jurist and notary there. His brothers included Nicola, a jurist and Roman senator, and Pietro Antonio, who also became a Dominican friar. Tolosani joined the Dominican friary in Florence on 24 June 1487, officially joining the order on 28 June the following year, remaining in the order until his death. In 1500, he became the first of the SS Annunziata in San Gimignano, the vice-prior of San Marco and was active in other convents. He worked on the chronicle of San Marco and San Maria del Sasso. He contributed to a cosmology in verse by Leonardo Dati, La Sfera (or Spera), in Florence in 1513.

Many scholars - including Copernicus - responded to the papal request for specialist help to correct the Roman calendar during the time of the Fifth Council of the Lateran. With such correction in mind, in 1514, Tolosani wrote De computatione annorum Domini in emendationem secundae inquisitionis libri su and Apusculum de correctione calendarii pro vera celebratione Pascatis. The council ended in 1517, just before the Reformation, but further help was requested by the papacy in the following decades. In 1523, he published Lettere di Sant'Antonino arcivescovo di Firenze for the canonization of that saint. In 1537, Tolosani had five documents published in Venice, together titled Opusculum de emendiationibus temporum [Breviloquio de Tempe in Italian]; these formed Tolosani's work on aligning the calendar to the seasons, written under the pseudonym of an invented Frenchman, Joannes Lucidus Samotheus. He also wrote a booklet on the maximum declination of the Sun. In 1546, a further edition of the work was produced containing two additional documents (the original was dated December 1545) under Tolosani's own name; Brevis annotatio emendatoria calendarii romani [short annotation to the Roman calendar corrections] was done at the direction of the vicar general of the Dominican order, including a mention of the right time to celebrate Easter, and was finished on 8 May 1545 for the Council of Trent.

The perceived importance of Tolosani's writings was elevated by his lifelong friend, Bartolommeo Spina, a noted philosopher and fellow Dominican from Pisa, who was appointed Master of the Sacred Palace by Pope Paul III in 1542. After Tolosani dedicated his latest work, De purissima veritate divinae Scripturae adversus errores humanos ['On the Very Pure Truth of Divine Scripture, against Human Errors] (divided into 250 inquisitions and completed in 1544) to Pope Paul, Spina received a papal direction to assess it and he praised it fulsomely in a letter of 1546, shortly before his own death.

In the fourth appendix to his Divine Scripture text, Tolosani claimed that Copernicus did not believe his own writings. Using his own logic and referencing previous and contemporary scientific opinion, he described Copernicus as an expert in mathematics and astronomy but "very deficient in physics and dialectics. Moreover he seems to be unfamiliar with Holy Scripture since he contradicts some of its principles, not without the risk to himself and to the readers of his book [De revolutionibus orbium coelestium] of straying from the faith." He went on to describe Copernicus as being ignorant of Aristotle and too supportive of Pythagorean ideas.

He died in Siena, in the convent of Santo Spirito, on January 22, 1549.

== Works ==
- Compendio di sphera et machina del mondo (in Italian). Firenze: Bernardo Zucchetta. 1514.
- De emendationibus temporum (in Latin). Venezia: Lucantonio Giunta (1.). 1537.

== Bibliography ==
- Lavenia, Vincenzo (2019). "TOLOSANI, Giovanni Maria". Dizionario Biografico degli Italiani, Volume 96: Toja–Trivelli (in Italian). Rome: Istituto dell'Enciclopedia Italiana. ISBN 978-8-81200032-6.
