= Georg von Kunheim =

German noble (1532–1611)

Georg von Kunheim (July 1532 – 18 October 1611), born in the Wehlau, Duchy of Prussia and died in Mühlhausen (modern Gvardeyskoye), married Margaretha Luther, youngest daughter and child of Martin Luther on August 5, 1555.

After Margaretha's death in 1570, Georg von Kunheim married Dorothea von Oelsnitz (1558 - February 2, 1602).
