= List of ancient Greek astronomers =

The ancient Greek astronomers listed below span the Archaic, Classical, Hellenistic, and Greco-Roman periods.

== Archaic Greece ==
- Anaximander
- Bion
- Empedocles
- Thales

== Classical Greece ==
- Aglaonice
- Anaxagoras
- Archytas
- Aristaeus
- Callippus
- Cleostratus
- Democritus
- Euctemon
- Eudoxus
- Heraclides
- Hicetas
- Hippocrates of Chios
- Meton
- Oenopides
- Parmenides
- Philip of Opus
- Philolaus

== Hellenistic Greece ==
- Apollonius
- Aratus
- Archimedes
- Aristarchus
- Aristyllus
- Attalus
- Autolycus
- Conon
- Eratosthenes
- Hipparchus
- Hypsicles
- Pytheas
- Seleucus
- Timocharis

== Greco-Roman ==
- Agrippa
- Andronicus
- Cleomedes
- Geminus
- Hephaestio
- Menelaus
- Porphyry
- Posidonius
- Proclus
- Ptolemy
- Sosigenes of Alexandria
- Sosigenes the Peripatetic
- Strabo
- Theodosius
- Theon of Alexandria
- Theon of Smyrna
