= Bartolomeo Spina =

Italian Dominican theologian and scholastic philosopher

Bartolomeo Spina (born at Pisa about 1475; died at Rome, 1546) was an Italian Dominican theologian and scholastic philosopher.

== Life ==
He joined the Dominican Order at Pisa in 1494. He was involved in the attempted take-over of the Milanese convent of Sant'Eustorgio by the Observant friars of the Congregation of Lombardy before becoming master of studies at the Dominican studio in Bologna in 1513–4.

As inquisitorial vicar in Modena from 1517–9, Spino was involved in prosecuting witches. He wrote against the Canon Episcopi, arguing based on the findings of the Inquisition that witches actually flew.

Spino served as regent master at S. Domenico in Bologna in the early 1530s. He was appointed (1536) by the Venetian Senate to the chair of theology at the University of Padua. He was also for a time socius of the Master-General of the Order of Preachers, and prior provincial of the Holy Land.

In July, 1542, he was made Master of the Sacred Palace by Pope Paul III, and during the four years that he discharged the duties of that office he rendered services to the Holy See and to the Fathers of the Council of Trent, regarding many difficult and mooted questions. As Master of the Sacred Palace, he was said to have wanted to move against Copernicus' De revolutionibus, only stopped by his death.

Spina denounced a number of other theologians as heretics. These included Thomas Cajetan, whom he clashed with starting in 1518; Ambrose Catharinus, whom he accused to Paul III in 1546; and Pietro Pomponazzi.

== Works ==
Spina's major works include:

- "Tutela Veritatis de Immortalitate Animæ contra Petrum Pomponatium" (1518)
- "Flagellum in Tres Libros Apologiæ Pomponatii de Immortalitate Animæ" (1518)
- "Tractatus de Strigibus et Lamiis" (Venice, 1523)
- "Apologiæ Tres adversus Joann. Franc. Ponzinibium Jurisperitum" (Venice, 1525)

He also edited many works of Thomas Aquinas, including his commentary on the Physics, Metaphysics, and logical works, as well as some of his Biblical commentaries (Matthew, Isaiah, Jeremiah, and Lamentations).

In his treatise "De Conceptione B. Mariæ Virg." (Venice, 1533), Spina opposed the doctrine of the Immaculate Conception.
