= Edward Rosen =

American historian of science (1906–1985)

- Born: December 12, 1906; Manhattan, New York, US
- Died: March 28, 1985 (aged 78); New York City, New York, US
- Occupation: Historian of science
- Known for: Translating Copernicus's complete works
- Awards: Guggenheim Fellowship (1941 and 1945); Pfizer Award (1968); Gold Order of Merit of the Republic of Poland (1978)

Academic background
- Education: City College of New York (BA 1926); Columbia University (MA 1929; PhD 1939)

Academic work
- Discipline: Historian of science
- Sub-discipline: Early modern science; History of astronomy; Nicolaus Copernicus
- Institutions: City College of New York (1926–); Graduate Center of the City University of New York

Edward Rosen (12 December 1906 – 28 March 1985) was an American historian of science known for his work on early modern science and, in particular, Nicolaus Copernicus, Galileo Galilei, and Johannes Kepler, especially his translation of the complete works of Copernicus. He was a distinguished professor emeritus at the City University of New York and was the winner of two Guggenheim Fellowships (1941, 1945), a Pfizer Award from the History of Science Society (1968), and the Gold Order of Merit of the Republic of Poland (1978).

== Early life and education ==
Rosen was born 12 December 1906 in Manhattan, New York. He was raised and educated in New York City. He attended Townsend Harris High School, then attended the City College of New York 1922–1926, graduating with a BA in classical languages. He then began teaching at City College while attending Columbia University for graduate study, where he received his MA in 1929 and his PhD in 1939.

At Columbia, he studied under historian William Linn Westermann. Initially, his studies focused on papyrology, but he changed his focus to Nicolaus Copernicus; this work resulted in his translation and commentary Three Copernican Treatises (1939), which were the first translations of any of Copernicus's works into English.

== Career ==
Rosen began teaching classical languages at the City College of New York after graduating in 1926, and later became associated with the Graduate Center of the City University of New York until his retirement in 1977. He was also a visiting professor at the Massachusetts Institute of Technology in 1957–1958 and at Indiana University in 1963–1964. He received a festschrift, Science and History: Studies in Honor of Edward Rosen (1978), shortly after retiring. In 1983, six years after his retirement, he was appointed Distinguished Professor Emeritus at the City University of New York.

Though he initially taught classical languages at City College, he was transferred to teaching more general history of Western civilization during the Great Depression. He interrupted his teaching briefly to serve in the US military during World War II, 1943–1945. He was chosen as a Guggenheim Fellow twice, once in 1941 and again in 1945.

In the course of his career, Edward Rosen published 11 books, more than 160 articles, and over 90 book reviews.

These were bookended by two major translation projects for the works of Nicolaus Copernicus: first, his Three Copernican Treatises (1939) produced for his dissertation, and last, his final translation of Copernicus's complete works in three volumes, first published as Nicholas Copernicus: Complete Works by Polish Scientific Publishers and then retitled for republication by Johns Hopkins University Press in 1992. The three volumes were first published in 1972, 1978, and 1985; the third volume was published posthumously. For his work on Copernicus, Rosen was awarded both a medal of the Copernicus Society of America in 1973 and the Gold Order of Merit of the Republic of Poland in 1978. His translation of Copernicus's De Revolutionibus was its first translation into English and was the first translation sponsored by Bern Dibner through the Burndy Library.

Rosen's translation and commentary on Johannes Kepler's novel Somnium, Kepler's Somnium: The Dream, or Posthumous Work on Lunar Astronomy (1967), was awarded the 1968 Pfizer Award by the History of Science Society. The length of his commentary matched or exceeded the length of the translation itself.

In addition to his translation work, Rosen was known for articles describing definitive studies of narrow questions of basic fact such as "The Authentic Title of Copernicus's Major Work" (1943), "The Date of Maurolico's Death" (1956), "Galileo's Misstatements about Copernicus" (1958), and "When did Copernicus write the 'Revolutions'?" (1977).

Rosen was also an active editor, in particular the managing editor of the Journal of the History of Ideas after several years on its editorial board for history of science.

== Death ==
Rosen died on 28 March 1985 in New York City.

== Selected works ==
For a complete bibliography, see (1) Rosen's festschrift Science and History: Studies in Honor of Edward Rosen (1978), edited by Erna Hilfstein, Paweł Czartoryski, and Frank D. Grande for Rosen's work 1939–1977 and (2) the last pages of Philip P. Wiener's in memoriam for Rosen in the Journal of the History of Ideas for Rosen's work 1977–1985.

=== Books ===
- Three Copernican Treatises (1939), translation and commentary on Copernicus's Commentariolus, his Letter against Werner, and Georg Joachim Rheticus's Narratio Prima; the first of Copernicus's work translated into English. Published by Columbia University Press.
- Kepler's Somnium: The Dream, or Posthumous Work on Lunar Astronomy (1967), translation and commentary on Kepler's novel Somnium; winner of the 1968 Pfizer Award. Published by University of Wisconsin Press.
- Complete works of Copernicus
  - First edition: Nicholas Copernicus: Complete Works, in three volumes (1972, 1978, 1985). Published by Polish Scientific Publishers.

=== Articles ===
- Rosen, Edward (October 1943). "The Authentic Title of Copernicus's Major Work". Journal of the History of Ideas. 4 (4): 457–474. doi:10.2307/2707168. JSTOR 2707168.
- Rosen, Edward (1956). "The Date of Maurolico's Death". Scripta Mathematica (22): 285–286.
- Rosen, Edward (September 1958). "Galileo's Misstatements about Copernicus". Isis. 49 (3): 319–330. JSTOR 226939.
- Rosen, Edward (1977). "When Did Copernicus Write the 'Revolutions'?". Sudhoffs Archiv. 61 (2): 144–155. JSTOR 20776466.

== Sources ==
- Grant, Edward (March 1986). "Eloge: Edward Rosen, 12 December 1906–28 March 1985". Isis. 77 (1): 303–304. doi:10.1086/354044. JSTOR 232507. S2CID 144152352.
- Hall, A. Rupert (June 1969). "Reviewed Work: Seventeenth Century - Kepler's Somnium: The Dream, or Posthumous Work on Lunar Astronomy". The British Journal for the History of Science. 4 (3): 298–299. doi:10.1017/S0007087400010116.
- Cohen, I. Bernard (May 1986). "Edward Rosen (1906–1985)". Journal for the History of Astronomy. 17 (49): 150–152. Bibcode:1986JHA....17..150C. doi:10.1177/002182868601700214. S2CID 126040345.
- Wiener, Philip P. (1986). "Remembering Edward Rosen". Journal of the History of Ideas. 47 (1): 159–161. JSTOR 2709602.
- Znaniecki, Florian (April 1941). "Reviewed Work: Three Copernican Treatises". The American Historical Review. 46 (3): 624–625. doi:10.1086/ahr/46.3.624. JSTOR 1839126.
