= Heinrich Petri =

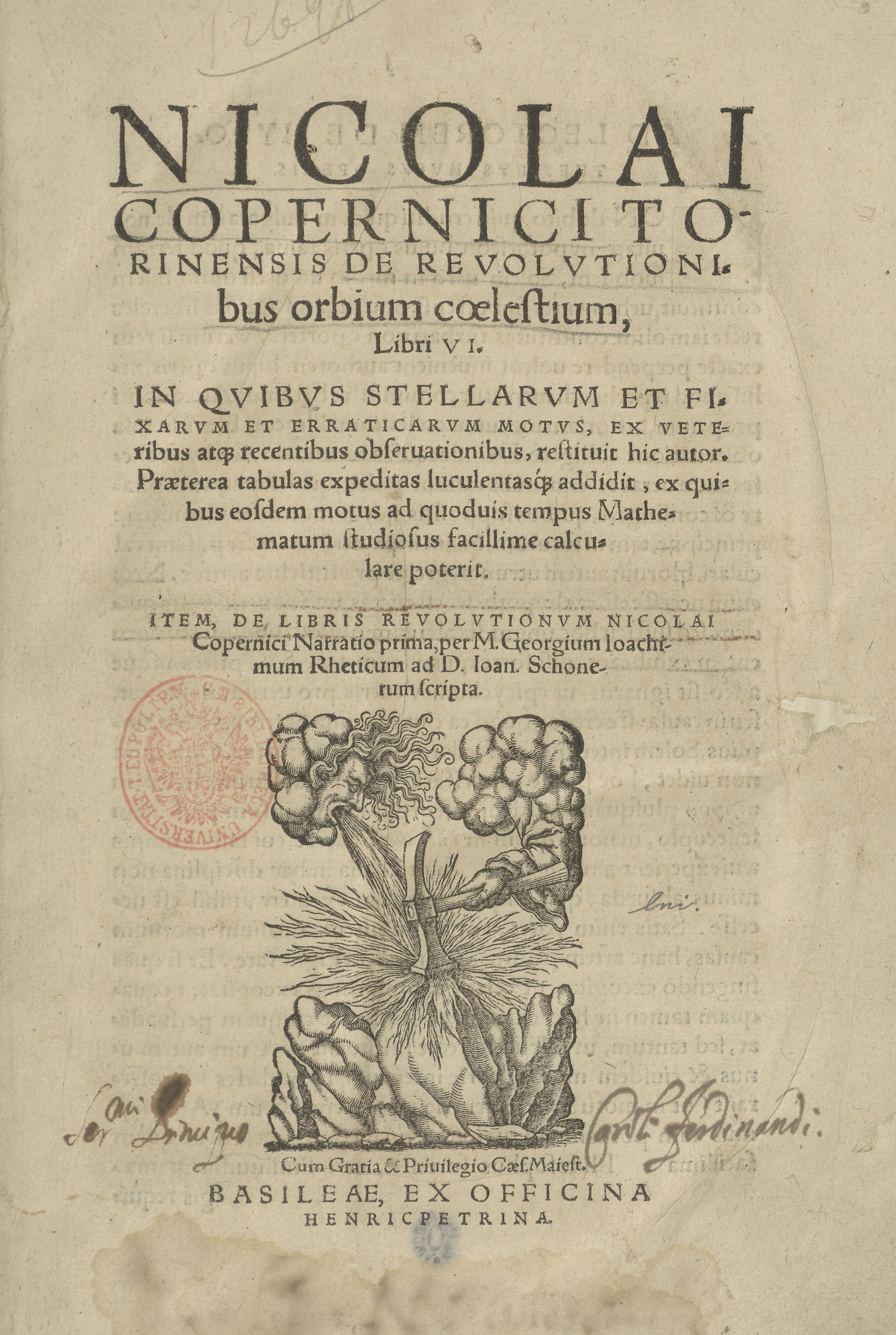
De revolutionibus orbium coelestium by Nicolaus Copernicus, title page of 2nd edition of 1566, Basilea, Ex Officina Henricpetrina

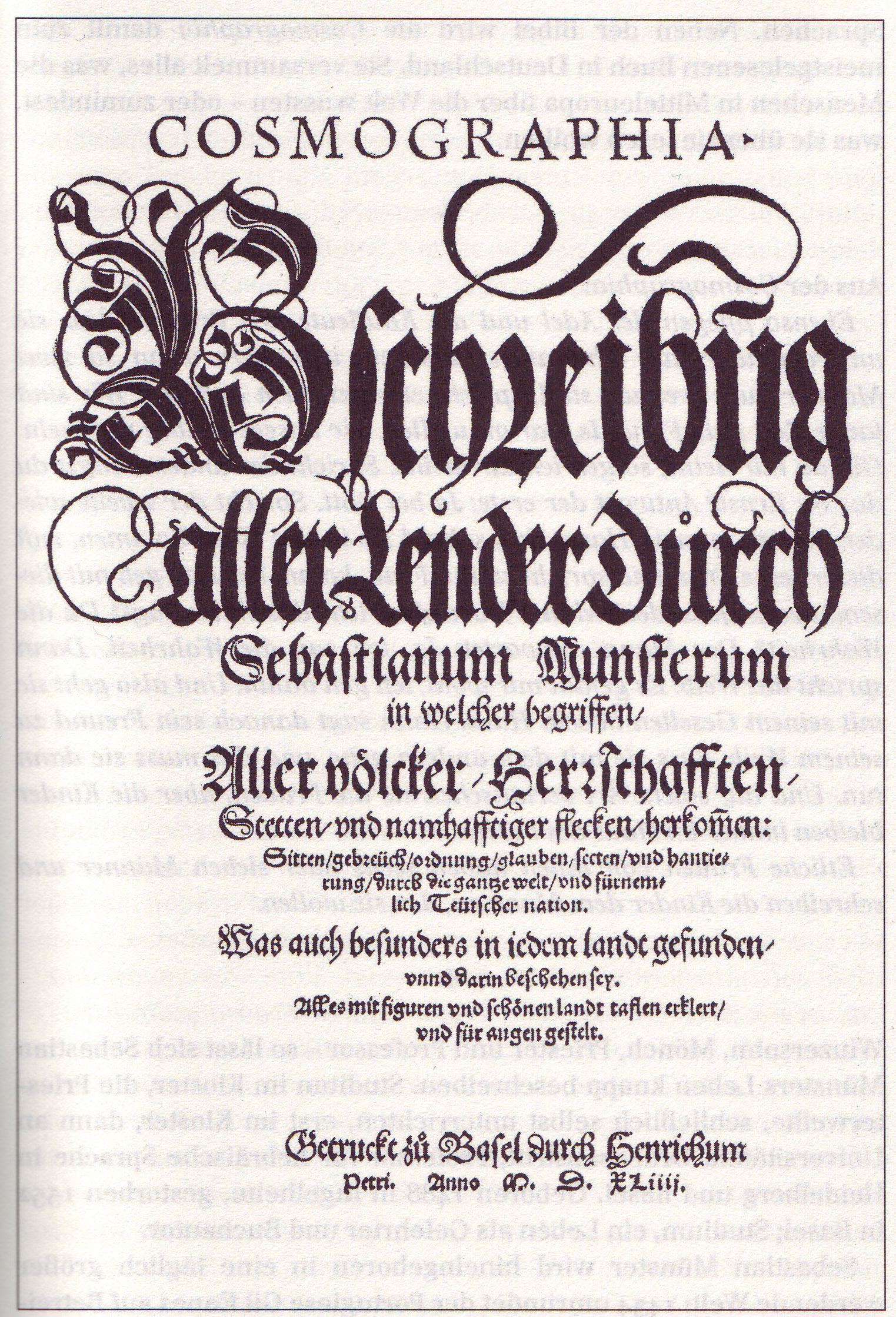
Cover of Cosmographia (Sebastian Münster), 1544

Heinrich Petri (Latin: Henricus Petri; 1508–1579), frequently misdeclined as "Henricus Petrus", and his son Sebastian Henric Petri (1546–1627) were influential early printers in Basel (Basilea). In addition to their own names, their printshop also used the Latin name Officina Henricpetrina.

Among their best known works, both of 1566, the second edition of De revolutionibus orbium coelestium by Nicolaus Copernicus, first published in 1543 in Nuremberg by Johannes Petreius, and of Narratio Prima by Georg Joachim Rheticus, published in 1540 in Danzig (Gdańsk) by Franz Rhode.

Also in 1566, Officina Henricpetrina published Petri Nonii Salaciensis Opera, the most important work by the Portuguese mathematician Pedro Nunes.

== Works ==
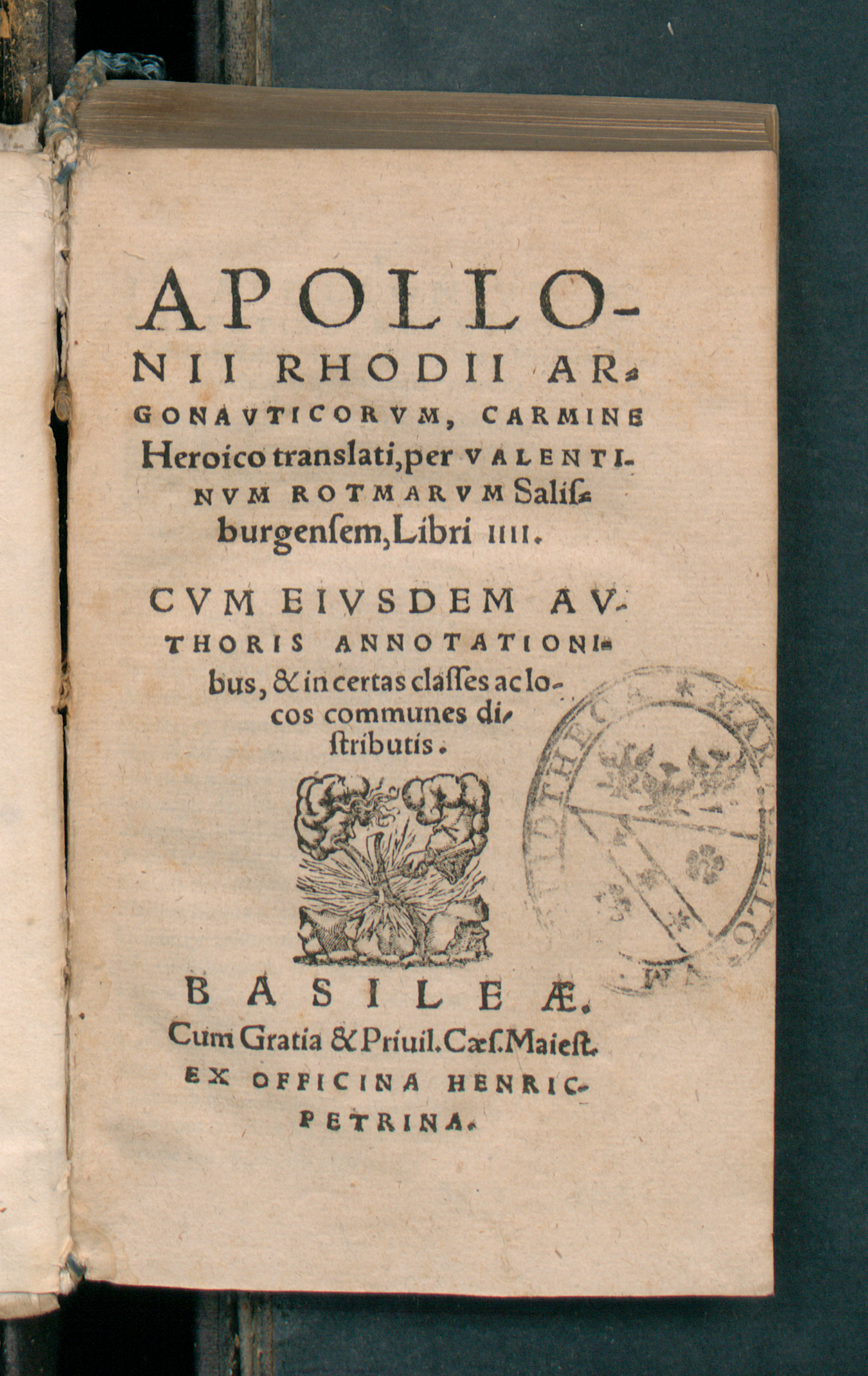
Argonautica, 1572

- Liber pantegni, Opera omnia ysaac. Ed. Andreas Turinus. Lugduni 1515; Constantini opera. Apud Henricus Petrus. Basileae 1536/39.
- The Cosmographia' by Sebastian Münster (1488–1552) from 1544 was the earliest German description of the world.
- Daniel Santbech, Problematum astronomicorum et geometricorum sectiones septem, published 1561 in Basel by Henrich Petri and Petrus Perna.
- Apollonius of Rhodes (1572). Argonautica (in Latin). Basileae: ex Officina Henricpetrina.
