= Wursteisen =

Wursteisen may refer to

- Christian Wurstisen (1544-1588), a mathematician, theologician and historian from Basel
- Christopher Wursteisen or Emanuel Wurstisen (1586-1601), son of Christian Wurstisen, law student at the University of Padua from 1595
