= Diego López de Zúñiga =

Diego López de Zúñiga may refer to:

- Diego López de Zúñiga, 4th Count of Nieva (c. 1510–1564), sixth viceroy of Peru, 1561–1564
- Diego López de Zúñiga (theologian) (died 1531), Spanish humanist and biblical scholar
