= Christian Wurstisen =

Swiss mathematician, theologian, and historian

Christian Wurstisen (Latin: Christianus Urstisius; 23 December 1544 – 29 March 1588) was a mathematician, theologian, historian from Basel. He was born in Liestal and died in Basel.

His name is also given as Wursteisen, Wurzticius, Ursticius, Urstisius, or Urstis.

== Life ==
In 1565, he became professor of mathematics at the Basel University, and in 1585 professor of theology. The next year, the city magistrate appointed him to the academy as a town historian, a position he held until his death. He was buried in Münster.

The second edition of Nicolaus Copernicus's De revolutionibus orbium coelestium had been printed in Basel. Wurstisen is credited to have first introduced Copernicus' work to Galileo Galilei, while Galilei's adoption of heliocentrism was often attributed to Michael Maestlin. Christian Wurstisen is mentioned by name in Galileo's Dialogue. This attribution has been challenged, however, and another similarly named man, Christopher Wursteisen, has been credited with introducing Copernicus's theories to Padua.

His mathematical book Elementa arithmeticae was read by John Milton and the Hungarian philosopher Andreas Dudith.

In his chronicle of Basel from 1580, Wurstisen named the heraldic tinctures after the initials of the given colours, a principle called tricking. Painter Gregorius Sickinger from Solothurn illustrated it.

== Works ==
- Wurstisen, Ch.: Bassler Chronick, dariñ alles, was sich in Oberen Teutschë Landen, nicht nur in der Statt und Bistumbe Basel, von ihrem Ursprung her, ... biss in das gegenwirtige MDLXXX. Jar, gedenckwirdigs zugetragen: sonder auch der Eydtgnoschafft, Burgund, Elsass und Breissgow ... warhafftig beschrieben: sampt vieler Herrschafften und Geschlechtern Wapen und Stambäumen, etc. (Eine Missive Enee Sylvii ... darinn die Statt Basel kurtzlich beschrieben. Durch C. Wurstisen ... vertolmetscht.).. pp. xx. 655. Sebastian Henricpetri: Basel, 1580. fol. Christian Wurstisen at Google Books
- Wurstisen, Ch. (Urstisius): Elementa arithmeticae, logicis legibus deducta in usum Academiae Basiliensis. Opera et studio Christiani Urstisii. Basileae, 1579. Sebastian Henricpetri.
- Wurstisen, Ch.: Germaniae historicorum illustrium, quorum plerique ab Henrico IIII Imperatore usque ad annum Christi, MDCCCC ... res gestas memoriae consecrarunt, tomus unus [-pars altera], Volume 1, apud heredes Andreae Wecheli, 1585 Christian Wurstisen at Google Books
- Matthias of Neuenburg, Albert of Straßburg, Johannes Cuspinianus, Christian Wurstisen: Matthiae Neoburgensis Chronica, cum continatione et Vita Berchtholdi de Buchegg: Die Chronik des Matthias von Neuenburg nach der Berner- und Strassburgerhandschrift mit den lesarten der ausgaben von Cuspinian und Urstisius, Stämpflische Buchdruckerei (G. Hünerwadel), 1866 Christian Wurstisen at Google Books
