= Diego de Zúñiga =

Spanish philosopher (1536–1597)

To be distinguished from Diego López de Zúñiga (theologian) (d.1531)

Diego de Zúñiga of Salamanca (sometimes Latinized as Didacus a Stunica) (1536–1597) was an Augustinian Hermit and academic. He is known for publishing an early acceptance of the Copernican theory, he was also the most important Augustinian scholastic thinker from the second half of the XVI century.

== Life ==
A student of Luis de León, he taught at the University of Osuna and the University of Salamanca.

His In Job commentaria (Commentary on Job, 1584) addressed Job 9:6, in such a way as to assert that the Copernican heliocentric theory was an acceptable interpretation of Scripture. This publication made him one of a very small number of Catholic scholars of the sixteenth century who set out an explicit accommodation with the ideas of Copernicus. He did, however, subsequently change his views, on another front, philosophical rather than theological. In Philosophia prima pars, written at the end of his life, he rejected Copernicanism as incompatible with Aristotelian theory on natural philosophy.

The Philosophia prima pars was a large-scale work on metaphysics, structured in accordance with current university practice, and aimed at a reform in the university teaching of philosophy. Written from an Aristotelian point of view, it aimed to fortify the Peripatetic philosophy, fending off sceptics and arguing for it as scientific. Against the skeptical attack, truth was treated under metaphysics.

The work of Zúñiga was placed on the Church's Index, together with Copernicus' De revolutionibus, by a decree of the Sacred Congregation from March 5, 1616:

(...) This Holy Congregation has also learned about the spreading and acceptance by many of the false Pythagorean doctrine, altogether contrary to the Holy Scripture, that the earth moves and the sun is motionless, which is also taught by Nicholaus Copernicus's 'On the Revolutions of the Heavenly Spheres' and by Diego de Zúñiga's 'On Job'. (...) Therefore, in order that this opinion may not creep any further to the prejudice of Catholic truth, the Congregation has decided that the books by Nicolaus Copernicus ('On the Revolutions of the Heavenly Spheres') and Diego de Zúñiga ('On Job') be suspended until corrected.

== Works ==
- Didaci a Stunica eremitae Agustiniani Philosophiae prima pars, qua perfecte et eleganter quatuor scientiae Metaphysica, Dialectica, Rhetorica et Physica declarantur, ad Clementem octavum Pontificem maximum
- De optimo genere tradendae totius Philosophiae et Sacrosanctae Scriturae explicandae
- De totius Dialectiacer constitutione contra Ramum pro Aristotele
- In Zachariam Prophetam Commentaria, 1577
- In Job Commentaria, the first edition by Ioannes Rodericus was published in Toledo, 1584. The second edition by Franciscum Zanettum was published in Rome, 1591.
