= Somnium (novel) =

1634 novel by Johannes Kepler

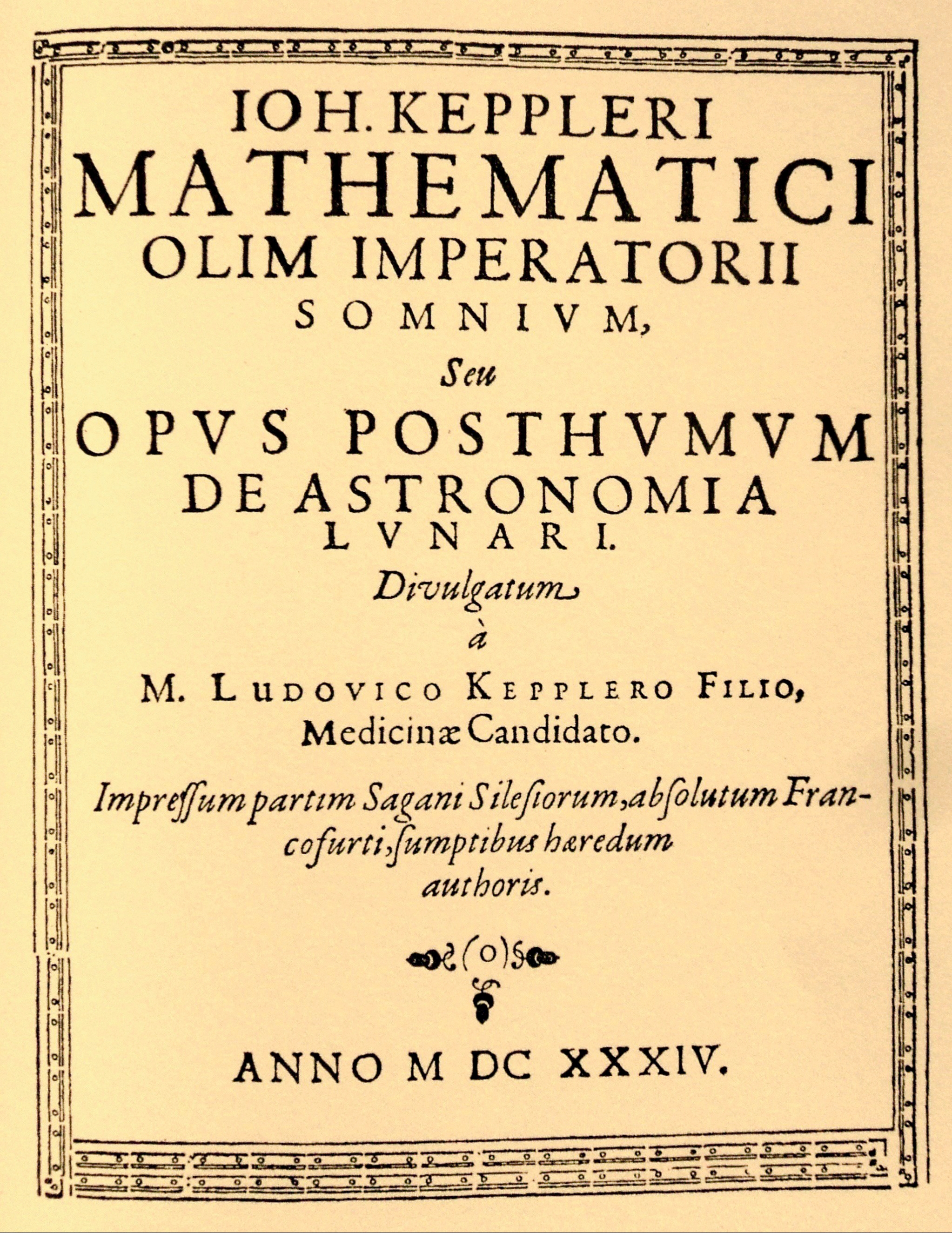
- Reproduction of 1634 title page
- Author: Johannes Kepler
- Language: Latin
- Genre: Science fiction
- Published: 1634

Somnium (Latin for "The Dream") — full title: Somnium, seu opus posthumum De astronomia lunari — is a novel written in Latin by Johannes Kepler in 1608/1609. It was first published in 1634 by Kepler's son, Ludwig Kepler, several years after the death of his father. In the narrative, an Icelandic boy and his witch mother learn of an island named Levania (the Hebrew word for the moon) from a daemon. Somnium presents a detailed imaginative description of how the Earth might look when viewed from the Moon, and is considered the first serious scientific treatise on lunar astronomy. Carl Sagan and Isaac Asimov have referred to it as one of the earliest works of science fiction.

== Plot summary ==
The story begins with Kepler reading about a skillful magician named Libussa. He falls asleep while reading about her. He recounts a strange dream he had from reading that book. The dream begins with Kepler reading a book about Duracotus, an Icelandic boy who is 14 years old. Duracotus's mother, Fiolxhilde, makes a living selling bags of herbs and cloth with strange markings on them. After he cuts into one of these bags and ruins her sale, Duracotus is sold by Fiolxhilde to a skipper. He travels with the skipper for a while until a letter is to be delivered to Tycho Brahe on the island of Hven. Since Duracotus is made seasick by the trip there, the skipper leaves Duracotus to deliver the letter and stay with Tycho.

Tycho asks his students to teach Duracotus Danish so they can talk. Along with learning Danish, Duracotus learns of astronomy from Tycho and his students. Duracotus is fascinated with astronomy and enjoys the time they spend looking at the night sky. Duracotus spends several years with Tycho before returning home to Iceland.

Upon his return to Iceland, Duracotus finds his mother still alive. She is overjoyed to learn that he is well-studied in astronomy as she too possesses knowledge of astronomy. One day, Fiolxhilde reveals to Duracotus how she learned of the heavens. She tells him about the daemons she can summon. These daemons can move her anywhere on Earth in an instant. If the place is too far away for them to take her, they describe it in great detail. She then summons her favorite daemon to speak with them.

The summoned daemon tells them, "Fifty thousand miles up in the Aether lies the island of Levania," which is Earth's Moon. According to the daemon, there is a pathway between the island of Levania and Earth. When the pathway is open, daemons can take humans to the island in four hours. The journey is a shock to humans, so they are sedated for the trip. Extreme cold is also a concern on the trip, but the daemons use their powers to ward it off. Another concern is the air, so humans have to have damp sponges placed in their nostrils in order to breathe. The trip is made with the daemons pushing the humans toward Levania with great force. At the Lagrangian point between the Earth and the Moon, the daemons have to slow the humans down lest they hurtle with great force into the Moon.

After describing the trip to Levania, the daemon notes that daemons are overpowered by the Sun. They dwell in the shadows of the Earth, called Volva by the inhabitants of Levania. The daemons can rush to Volva during a solar eclipse, otherwise they remain hidden in shadows on Levania.

After the daemon describes other daemons' behavior, she goes on to describe Levania. Levania is divided into two hemispheres called Privolva and Subvolva, corresponding to the far and near sides of the Moon. Privolva never sees Volva, while Subvolva sees Volva as their moon. Volva goes throughout the same phases as the actual Moon.

The daemon continues the descriptions of Subvolva and Privolva. Some of these details are scientific in nature, including how eclipses would look from the Moon, the sizes of the planets varying due to the Moon's distance from the Earth, and an idea about the size of the Moon. Other details are fictional in nature, such as descriptions of the creatures that inhabit Subvolva and Privolva, plant growth on each side, and the life and death cycle of Levania.

The dream is cut short in the middle of the description of the creatures of Privolva. Kepler wakes up from the dream because of a storm outside. He then realizes that his head is covered and he is wrapped in blankets just like the characters in his story.

== Publication history ==
=== Development ===
Somnium began as a student dissertation in which Kepler defended the Copernican doctrine of the motion of the Earth, suggesting that an observer on the Moon would find the Earth's movements as clearly visible as the Moon's activity is to the Earth's inhabitants. While the work was intended to be presented as a disputation for his school, Tübingen University, the professor in charge of such works, Veit Müller, was so strongly opposed to Copernicanism that he did not permit Kepler's thesis to be heard. Nearly 20 years later, Kepler added the dream framework after frequent friendly debating with a Prague official and hobby astronomer, leading him to first attempt "lunar geography" as he would put it. After another decade, he drafted a series of explanatory notes reflecting upon his turbulent career and the stages of his intellectual development. The book was edited by Ludwig Kepler and Jacob Bartsch, after Kepler's death in 1630.

Karl Siegfried Guthke notes that this means that the story predates the invention of the telescope.

=== Publication ===
There are many similarities to Kepler's real life in Somnium. Duracotus spends a considerable amount of time working for Tycho Brahe. Kepler worked under Tycho Brahe in 1600 before becoming Imperial Mathematician. Kepler's mother, Katharina Kepler, would be arrested on 49 charges of being a witch because the character Fiolxhilde resembled her. Kepler believed that a copy of the manuscript-in-progress found its way to Tübingen around 1611 which fueled the rumour. Kepler took the issue seriously as witch hunting was at its peak and he fought for five years to free her. He had to pause his scientific work for those years while he was busy defending his mother. Katherina died within one year of her acquittal while seeking justice for the false charges put on her. After her death, Kepler wrote over 200 explanatory notes to explain his narrative. The book was published posthumously in 1634 by his son, Ludwig Kepler.

== Science ==
=== Levania ===
Kepler uses a daemon to describe the island of Levania in many scientific ways. The fixed stars are in the same position as the Earth's fixed stars. The planets appear larger from Levania than from Earth due to the distance Levania is from Earth. Levania also sees planetary motions in a different way. Unlike the moon, which traverses the sky from a terrestrial point of view, the Earth remains fixed in the lunar sky as a consequence of tidal locking. The only small movements the Earth makes are due to the moon's librations. The inhabitants at the divisor see the planets different from the rest of the Moon. Mercury and Venus specifically seem bigger to them.

=== Privolva ===
A day is around 14 Earth days, sometimes less. Night on Privolva is 15 or 16 Earth days. During the nights, Privolva experiences intense cold and strong winds. During the day, Privolva experiences extreme heat with no wind. During the night, water is pumped to Subvolva. During the Privolvan day, some of the water is pumped back to Privolva to protect its inhabitants from the intense heat. The inhabitants are described as giants who hide under water to escape the heat of the day.

=== Subvolva ===
A day and night is around 30 Earth days. A day on Subvolva represents the phases of the Moon on Earth. Subvolva sees the Earth as its moon. The Earth goes through phases just as the Moon does during their night. Kepler notes that Subvolva is inhabited by serpent-like creatures. The Subvolvan terrain is full of fields and towns, just like Earth. At night on Privolva all of the water is pumped to Subvolva to submerge the land so only a small portion of land remains above the waves. The Subvolvans are protected from the Sun by almost constant cloud cover and rain.

== Editions ==
- Johannes Kepler (1634). Somnium, seu opus posthumum De astronomia lunari. Frankfurt.
- Johannes Kepler (1962). The Somnium Astronomicum of Johann Kepler Translated, with Some Observations on Various Sources (MA thesis). Translated by Norman Raymond Farladeau. Creighton University. hdl:10504/109241.
- John Lear (1965). Kepler's Dream, with the full text and notes of "Somnium, Sive Astronomia Lunaris, Joannis Kepleri," translated by Patricia Frueh Kirkwood. Berkeley: University of California Press.
- Johannes Kepler (1967). Kepler's Somnium: The Dream, Or Posthumous Work on Lunar Astronomy. Translated by Edward Rosen. University of Wisconsin Press, reprinted 2003 by Courier Dover Publications. ISBN 978-0-486-43282-3.
- Johannes Kepler (2025). Somnium. Translated and introduced by Michael Windsperger. Black Letter Press.
