= Michael Maestlin =

German astronomer and mathematician (1550–1631)

Deacon Michael Maestlin
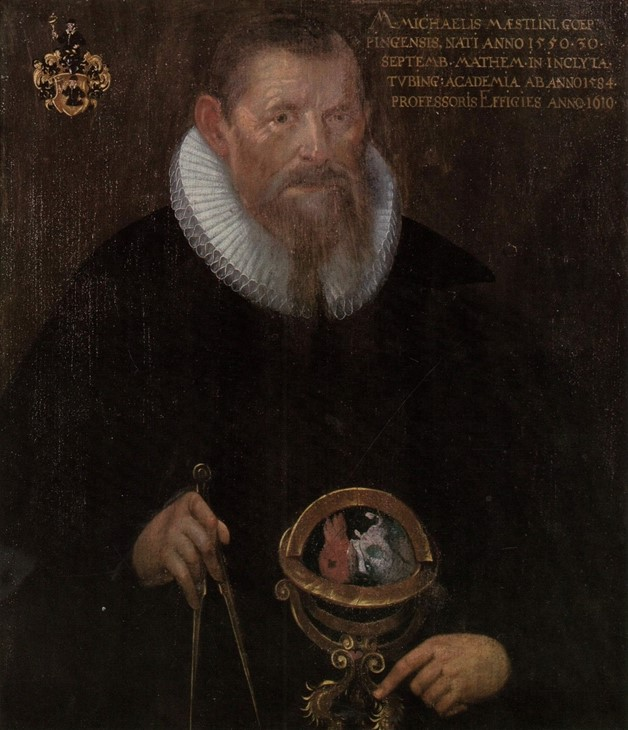
- Portrait of Maestlin, 1619
- Born: 30 September 1550; Göppingen, Duchy of Württemberg, Holy Roman Empire
- Died: 26 October 1631 (aged 81); Tübingen, Duchy of Württemberg, Holy Roman Empire
- Education: Tübinger Stift
- Known for: First known decimal approximation of the (inverse) golden ratio
- Scientific career
- Academic advisors: Philipp Apian
- Notable students: Johannes Kepler

Signature
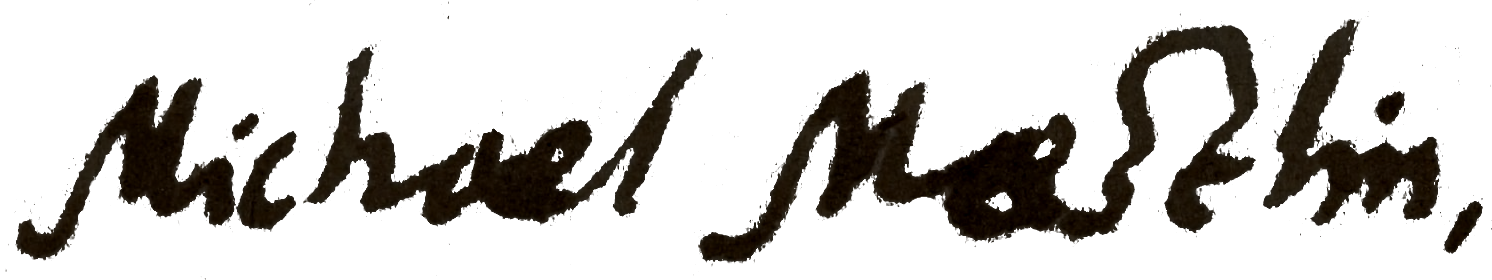

Michael Maestlin (German: [ˈmɛstliːn]; also Mästlin, Möstlin, or Moestlin; 30 September 1550 – 26 October 1631) was a German astronomer and mathematician, best known as the mentor of Johannes Kepler. A student of Philipp Apian, Maestlin is recognized as the teacher who had the greatest influence on Kepler. He is regarded as one of the most significant astronomers of the period between Copernicus and Kepler. He was the first to write a decimal approximation of the Golden ratio.

== Early life and family ==
Maestlin was born on 30 September 1550 in Göppingen, a small town in southern Germany located about 50 kilometres (31 mi) east of Tübingen. The son of Jakob Maestlin and Dorothea Simon, he was born into a Protestant family. Maestlin had an older sister named Elisabeth and a younger brother named Matthäus.

His family's original surname was Leckher or Legecker, and they lived in the village of Boll, a few kilometers south of Göppingen. In his autobiography, Maestlin recounts how the family name Legecker was changed to Mästlin. He explains that one of his ancestors received the nickname after an old blind woman touched him and exclaimed, "Wie bist du doch so mast und feist! Du bist ein rechter Mästlin!" This roughly translates to, "How are you so large and plump? You are truly a fatso!"

Maestlin married Margarete Grüniger on 9 April 1577. While little information is available about his children from this marriage, it is known that he had at least three sons—Ludwig, Michael, and Johann Georg—and at least three daughters—Margareta, Dorothea Ursula, and Anna Maria. In 1588, Margarete died at the age of 37, possibly due to complications from childbirth. This untimely loss left several children under Maestlin's care and may have influenced his decision to remarry the following year.

In 1589, Maestlin married Margarete Burkhardt. Together, they had eight children. In a letter to Johannes Kepler written that same year, Maestlin shared how deeply troubled he was by the death of his month-old son, August.

== Education ==
In 1565, at around 15 years of age, Maestlin was sent to the nearby Klosterschule in Königsbronn. In 1567, he transferred to a similar school in Herrenalb. After completing his education there, Maestlin enrolled at the University of Tübingen, matriculating on 3 December 1568. In 1569, he entered the university as a recipient of a scholarship from the Duke of Württemberg.

Maestlin studied theology at the Tübinger Stift, an elite educational institution founded in 1536 by Duke Ulrich von Württemberg. He earned his Baccalaureate in 1569 and his master's degree in 1571. After obtaining his master's degree, Maestlin remained at the university as both a theology student and a tutor in the seminary church in Württemberg.

Letters concerning Maestlin’s academic qualifications reveal that he graduated summa cum laude, ranking third in a graduating class of twenty. During his studies, Maestlin was taught by Philipp Apian, though the exact courses he took remain uncertain. It is believed Apian taught topics such as Frisius's Arithmetic, Euclid's Elements, Proclus's Sphera, Peurbach's Theoricae Novae Planetarus, and the use of geodetic instruments.

Apian’s teachings appear to have influenced Maestlin’s work, particularly his paper on sundials, which includes structured elements of celestial globes and maps.

In 1584, Maestlin was appointed Professor of Mathematics at the University of Tübingen. He served as Dean of the Arts Faculty during the following terms: 1588–89, 1594–95, 1600–01, 1607–09, 1610–11, 1615, 1623, and 1629. Maestlin primarily taught trigonometry and astronomy, and it is highly likely that he used his book, Epitome Astronomiae, as a reference in his lectures.

In 1576, Maestlin was appointed as a deacon at the Lutheran church in Backnang, a town about 30 kilometers northwest of Göppingen. While there, he observed the comet of 1577. Tycho Brahe, observing the same comet from Denmark, used parallax measurements to determine that the comet was located beyond the Moon, contradicting the astronomical theories of Aristotle and Ptolemy. Maestlin independently arrived at a similar conclusion and, within the framework of the Copernican system, proposed that the comet resided in a region between the spheres of Venus and the Earth-Moon system. From 1577 to 1580, Maestlin also served as the chief scientific adviser to the Duke of Württemberg.

== Career ==
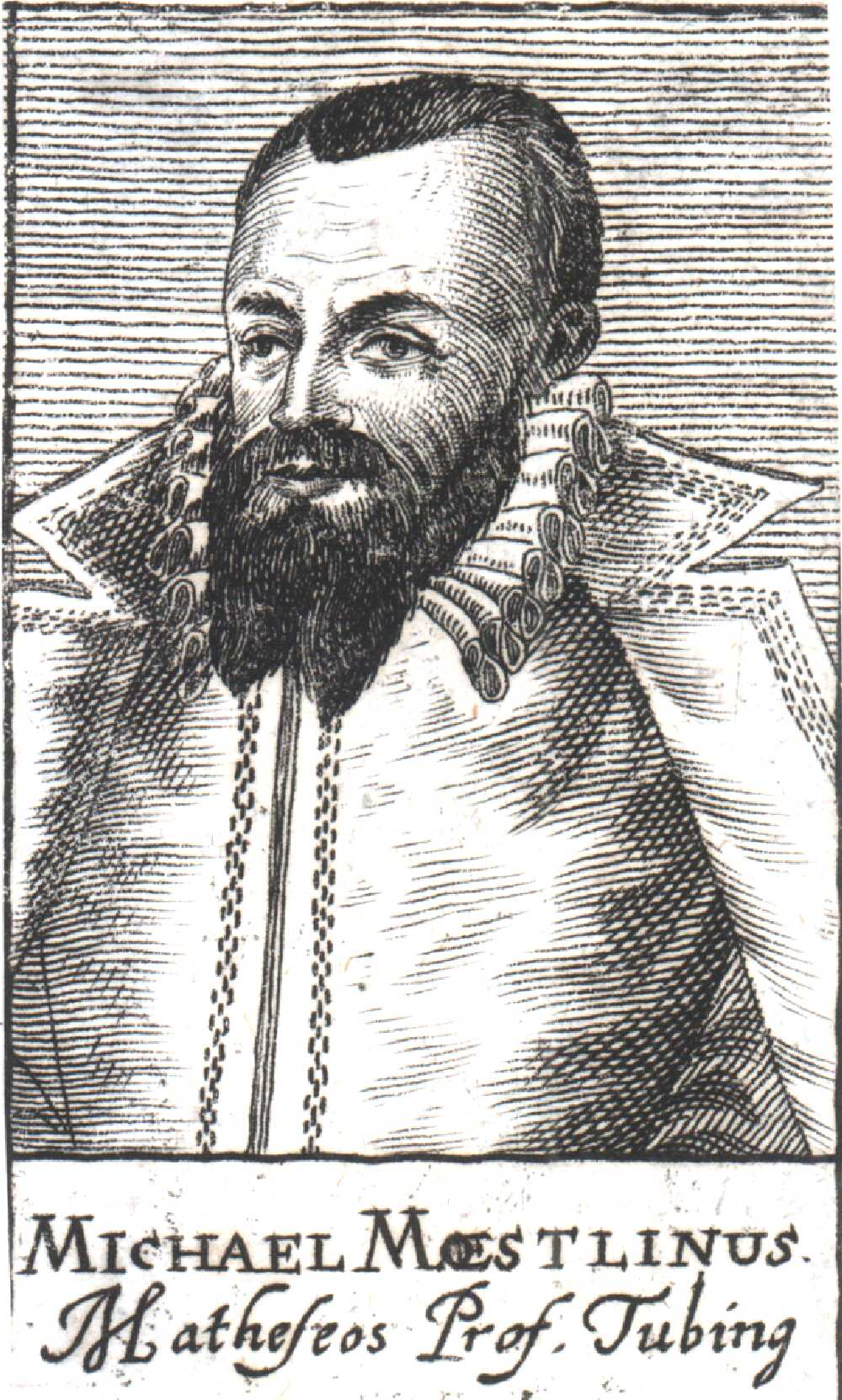
1688 engraving of Maestlin

In 1580, Maestlin became a professor of mathematics, first at the University of Heidelberg, and later at the University of Tübingen, where he taught for 47 years starting in 1583. In 1582, he authored a popular introduction to astronomy.

While teaching at the university, Maestlin primarily taught traditional Ptolemaic astronomy in his courses. However, he introduced Copernican heliocentric astronomy to his advanced students, fostering a deeper understanding of the revolutionary model.

While Maestlin had diverse interests, including calendar reform and mathematics, he was, above all, an astronomer. He dedicated much of his research to studying the Sun, the Moon, and eclipses. His 1596 work, Disputatio de Eclipsibus, focuses almost entirely on the Sun and the Moon and is frequently referenced in Kepler's 1604 work, Astronomiae Pars Optica.

In 1587, Maestlin published a manuscript titled Tabula Motus Horarii, which provides the daily motion of the Sun in hours and minutes, along with its positions in two-minute intervals. He also published other tables that present equivalent information in degrees, minutes, and seconds.

Among Maestlin's students was Johannes Kepler, who regarded him not only as a teacher but also as a lifelong mentor. Although Maestlin primarily taught the traditional geocentric Ptolemaic model of the Solar System, he was one of the earliest proponents of the heliocentric Copernican view and introduced it to his advanced students.

Maestlin frequently corresponded with Kepler and played a significant role in influencing his adoption of the Copernican system. Additionally, Maestlin's work is credited with contributing to Galileo Galilei's acceptance of heliocentrism.

The first known calculation of the (inverse) golden ratio as a decimal, approximately 0.6180340, was made by Maestlin in 1597. He included this calculation in a letter to Kepler about the Kepler triangle.

Maestlin was one of the few astronomers of the 16th century to fully embrace the Copernican hypothesis, which proposed that the Earth was a planet that moved around the Sun. In 1570, he acquired a copy of Copernicus' seminal work, De revolutionibus orbium coelestium (Maestlin's personal copy, containing his handwritten notes in the margins, is preserved in the municipal library of Schaffhausen).

In his notes, Maestlin responded to the concept of distant stars revolving around a fixed Earth every 24 hours. He also shared everything he could about Copernicus' work with Kepler.

In accepting the Copernican view of the Solar System, Maestlin believed that the "movement of commutation" (or "parallactic motion") of the superior planets—those farther from the Sun than Earth—and the lack of parallactic motion in the supernova meant that the supernova must have occurred outside the planetary spheres, in the realm of fixed stars. This contradicted the previous understandings of the Ptolemaic and Aristotelian models.

Maestlin also concluded that the nova provided evidence for the heliocentric Solar System. He argued that unless people concede that comets can exist in the stellar orb, which has an immense altitude and an unknown extent, the distance between the Sun and the Earth, as described by Copernicus, remains incomparable.

In 1589, Maestlin published a dissertation on the fundamental principles of astronomy and the first edition of his book Epitome Astronomiae (Epitome of Astronomy). Epitome Astonomiae went through six editions and used works such as Ptolemy's famous geocentric model to create detailed descriptions of astronomy.

The preface to the 1596 republication of Georg Joachim Rheticus' Narratio Prima was written by Maestlin. This preface served as an introduction to the work of Copernicus.

In 1613, Maestlin acquired his first set of telescopes. In a letter to Kepler, Maestlin mentioned that he was unable to observe the satellites of Saturn or the phases of Venus; however, he was able to see the moons of Jupiter.

=== SN 1572 supernova ===
In November 1572, Maestlin and many others around the world witnessed a strange light in the sky, which we now know was a galactic supernova. This Type Ia supernova, known as SN 1572, occurred in the constellation Cassiopeia and was the first galactic supernova to be observed in Europe.

Maestlin attempted to explain this phenomenon in his tract Demonstratio astronomica loci stellae novae, tum respectu centri mundi, tum respectu signiferi & aequinoctialis. This short mathematical and astronomical appendix, which detailed the supernova, was published in Tübingen in March or April 1573.

Maestlin's treatise attracted the attention of Tycho Brahe, who reproduced it in its entirety, along with his own criticisms, in one of the best-known publications on the subject, his posthumously printed Astronomiae instauratae progymnasmata. Maestlin's treatise is available in manuscript form in Stuttgart and Marburg.

Maestlin's treatise on the nova of 1572 featured many aspects remarkably similar to Tycho de Brahe's much longer treatise on the same nova, titled De Stella Nova. Both treatises were published in 1602, although Maestlin's was believed to have been written much earlier. In his work, Maestlin focused extensively on the mathematics behind determining the exact location of the new star.

=== Great comet of 1577 ===
In accordance with the Copernican view of the heavens, Johannes Kepler calculated that there were empty spaces between the planetary orbits, and Maestlin suggested that these spaces might be where comets frequently occur. This revelation was only possible under the assumption of a heliocentric universal organization. Maestlin is believed to have adopted the heliocentric view after observing the path of the Great Comet of 1577.

When the comet appeared, Maestlin, along with the Danish astronomer Tycho Brahe, was one of the first to actively calculate its path in a more complex manner than simply tracking its movement across the sky. Tycho Brahe and Maestlin concluded that the comet was not just traveling across the sky but was also passing through Aristotle's and Ptolemy's solid geocentric orbs, suggesting that the planetary spheres were not solid, as previous astronomers had believed.

In 1589, Maestlin shared his conclusions about the comet's appearance with his friend, the astrologer Helisaeus Roeslin, who believed that the Great Comet of 1577 was located beyond the Moon.

=== Role in Kepler's Mysterium Cosmographicum ===
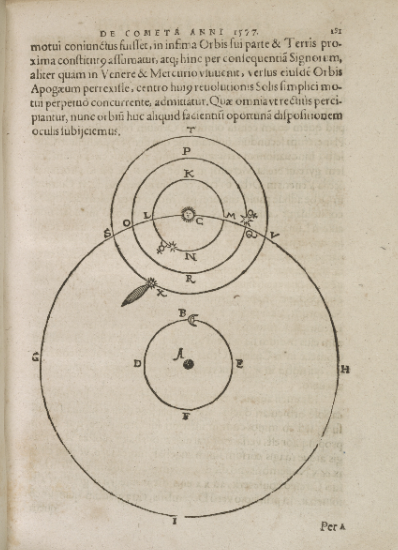
Tycho Brahe's depiction of the comet of 1577 traveling across the sky

Maestlin also supervised and made significant contributions to the tables and diagrams in Kepler's Mysterium Cosmographicum, published in 1596. Maestlin and Kepler communicated through letters about the book, and some of these letters formed the foundation of Maestlin's appendix to the publication. This appendix focused on Copernican planetary theory, using the values from Erasmus Reinhold's Prutenic Tables to determine a set of planetary distances.

The appendix was titled "On the Dimensions of the Heavenly Circles and Spheres, According to the Prutenic Tables After the Theory of Nicolaus Copernicus" and was intended to address "the needs of a hypothetical educated reader" while answering some of the questions Kepler had raised in the book. Maestlin also discussed Kepler's work, commenting on the quality of his findings and his knowledge of astronomy.

In addition to his appendix, Maestlin also contributed his own understanding of Nicolaus Copernicus' geometry to Kepler's book. In their correspondence, they discussed topics such as the inaccuracies in the values that Copernicus used when calculating the spheres of the cosmos.

Kepler believed that he had discovered the distances between the Sun and the planets in 1595. He assumed equal velocity for each planet and observed that the planets did not revolve according to the length of their radii. Kepler noted that the Sun exerted a force that progressively weakened the farther a planet was from it. Maestlin provided the geometry to help visualize Kepler's theory of the Sun's force and its effects on the other planets, which was included in Mysterium Cosmographicum.

Maestlin also added diagrams illustrating his views on the order of the planets and their spacing. This was the first time such diagrams had been created. However, these diagrams caused a misunderstanding that lasted for centuries, as Maestlin did not clarify whether the planets were meant to move along the lines of the circles representing his planetary system or within the spaces he had drawn. This led many to believe that the planetary system proposed by Copernicus involved fewer modifications (such as epicycles) than Ptolemy’s system, when in fact the opposite was true.

Despite the confusion these diagrams caused, Maestlin is still credited with making significant contributions to Kepler's Mysterium. Kepler even acknowledged Maestlin's co-authorship of the book in a letter to him.

=== Kepler's Supernova ===
In 1604, Maestlin was one of the first astronomers to observe the 1604 Supernova (later known as Kepler's Supernova) on 9 October. He made his observations visually, without instruments, but did not immediately publish them. Instead, he began working on a treatise titled Consideratio Astronomica inusitatae Novae et prodigiosae Stellae, superiori 1604 anno, sub initium Octobris, iuxta Eclipticam in signo Sagittarii vesperi exortae, et adhuc nunc eodem loco lumine corusco lucentis (Astronomical Consideration of the Extraordinary and Prodigious New Star that Appeared Near the Ecliptic in the Sign of Sagittarius One Evening in Early October in the Preceding Year 1604, and Continues to Shine in the Same Place with a Tremulous Light). He intended to publish the treatise in the following years. Maestlin began working seriously on it in 1606; however, it was never fully completed.

While Maestlin was frequently in communication with Kepler between 1594 and 1600, he stopped responding to him between 1600 and 1605. Kepler, eager to maintain the conversation, wrote many letters but received no response. One theory suggests that Maestlin's silence was due to his fear that Kepler would publish their correspondence, while another theory proposes that it was the result of a personal crisis, possibly triggered by rumors of his own suicide.

Frustrated with Maestlin's refusal to continue their correspondence, Kepler complained in a letter dated 14 December 1604. He urged Maestlin to respond with his thoughts on the recently discovered and widely discussed 1604 Supernova. Kepler argued that failing to comment on this event would make Maestlin guilty of the "crime of deserting astronomy."

Maestlin finally responded at the end of January 1605. He explained his silence by claiming that he had nothing more to add to the prior explanations regarding Kepler's questions. As for the nova, Maestlin concluded that it was simply a star that had previously gone unnoticed or undiscovered.

Maestlin did begin writing a treatise on Kepler's supernova, though it was never finished. This work, written entirely in Latin, was titled Consideratio Astronomica inusitatae Novae et prodigiosae Stellae, superiori 1604 anno, sub initium Octobris, iuxta Eclipticam in signo Sagittarii vesperi exortae, et adhuc nunc eodem loco lumine corusco lucentis (Astronomical consideration of the extraordinary and prodigious new star that appeared near the ecliptic in the sign of Sagittarius one evening in early October in the preceding year 1604, and continues to shine in the same place with a tremulous light).

The work is just over 12 pages and remains unfinished, leading scholars to believe that either Maestlin failed to complete it or that the final pages were lost over time. It is estimated that Maestlin wrote the treatise in April 1605, as he describes the months of February or March when the supernova showed signs of decreasing intensity and brightness. He predicted its expiration or disappearance in May of the same year, reasoning that the Sun would be in opposition to the nova at that time.

Maestlin extensively discussed the intensity and magnitude of the nova, comparing it to patterns seen in previous novas, such as that of 1572. While the 1572 nova was first observed at a certain magnitude and then steadily decreased in brightness, the 1604 supernova maintained a large magnitude for a significant period, comparable to a first-magnitude star like Venus or the other brightest stars.

== Christianity ==
During the time of Maestlin and Kepler, questioning God's responsibility for creating the world and all the creatures in it could be seen as dangerous, as one might be accused of blasphemy. However, Maestlin viewed things differently. As a follower of the Lutheran Church, he believed that studying the natural world and uncovering the laws that govern it would bring humanity closer to God. In Maestlin's view, understanding God's creations would help his children draw nearer to Him and His divine plan. He further believed that learning more about the natural world would enrich humanity's knowledge of God. At one point, Maestlin had even been a Lutheran pastor.

Maestlin used his notability to project his religious and political views. In 1582, Maestlin expressed his opinions in treatises on the new Gregorian calendar and its creation. His arguments focused on both mathematical and political perspectives. He agreed that the Julian calendar was inaccurate, as it calculated the year to be 365 days and 6 hours long, but as Maestlin pointed out, the year is actually "365 days, five hours, forty-nine minutes, and 46 seconds long." He also argued that the golden numbers used in the Julian calendar were calculated incorrectly.

While his mathematical argument largely supported the replacement of the Julian calendar, his political arguments were more critical. Maestlin was opposed to the adoption of the Gregorian calendar, even though he acknowledged the need for a more accurate calendar. He argued that the need for a new calendar had been recognized for over two hundred years, yet nothing had been done. He suggested that the reason the calendar was being adopted now was because the Catholic Church had lost power, and the Pope wanted "to further his dominion." This reflected Maestlin's dislike of the Pope's position, as shown by his statement that the Pope did not direct "the movements of the sun and moon." Maestlin believed that the Pope was attempting to exert influence over countries that had recently reduced his power.

Furthermore, Maestlin suggested that only educated people would notice the problems with the calendar. He also believed that the judgment day in the year 2000, according to the Julian calendar, would be inaccurate by three days. Therefore, he did not consider the correction to be worth the change.

== Notable astronomical observations ==
- Maestlin catalogued the Pleiades cluster on 24 December 1579, recording eleven stars in the cluster, and possibly observing as many as fourteen.
- He also witnessed the occultation of Mars by Venus on 13 October 1590 while at Heidelberg.
- Maestlin observed Kepler's Supernova on 9 October 1604 but did not begin publicly recording the observation until 1606.

== Legacy ==
- Asteroid 11771 Maestlin, discovered in 1973
- Lunar Crater: Maestlin
- Lunar Rille: Rimae Maestlin

In Jules Verne's Cinq semaines en ballon (Five Weeks in a Balloon), the character of Joe, the manservant, is described as having, "in common with Maestlin, Kepler's professor, the rare ability to distinguish the satellites of Jupiter with the naked eye, and to count fourteen of the stars in the Pleiades cluster, the remotest of which being only of the ninth magnitude."

Maestlin is commemorated by several works of art. The first is a woodcut portrait created specifically for him. The second is part of a monument dedicated to Johannes Kepler in Weil der Stadt, Kepler's hometown. Kepler's monument features four statues of individuals who profoundly influenced his work in astronomy, and one of them is of Michael Maestlin. The third artwork is a plaque on the same monument, depicting Maestlin teaching Kepler and his other students.

In 2000, a conference was held in Tübingen, where Maestlin had been a professor, to discuss his life and works. From this, Gerhard Betsch produced a collective volume summarizing their findings, which included a breakdown of Maestlin's works and an overview of his nachlass. Maestlin's nachlass had been preserved in various library archives in both Germany and Austria. Betsch discussed several aspects in his dissertation, including a treatise composed by Maestlin on the comet of 1618–1619, which was written entirely in German.

== See also ==
- Golden ratio
- Johannes Kepler
- Copernican heliocentrism
- History of Mars observation
