= Achilles Gasser =

German physician and astrologer (1505–1577)

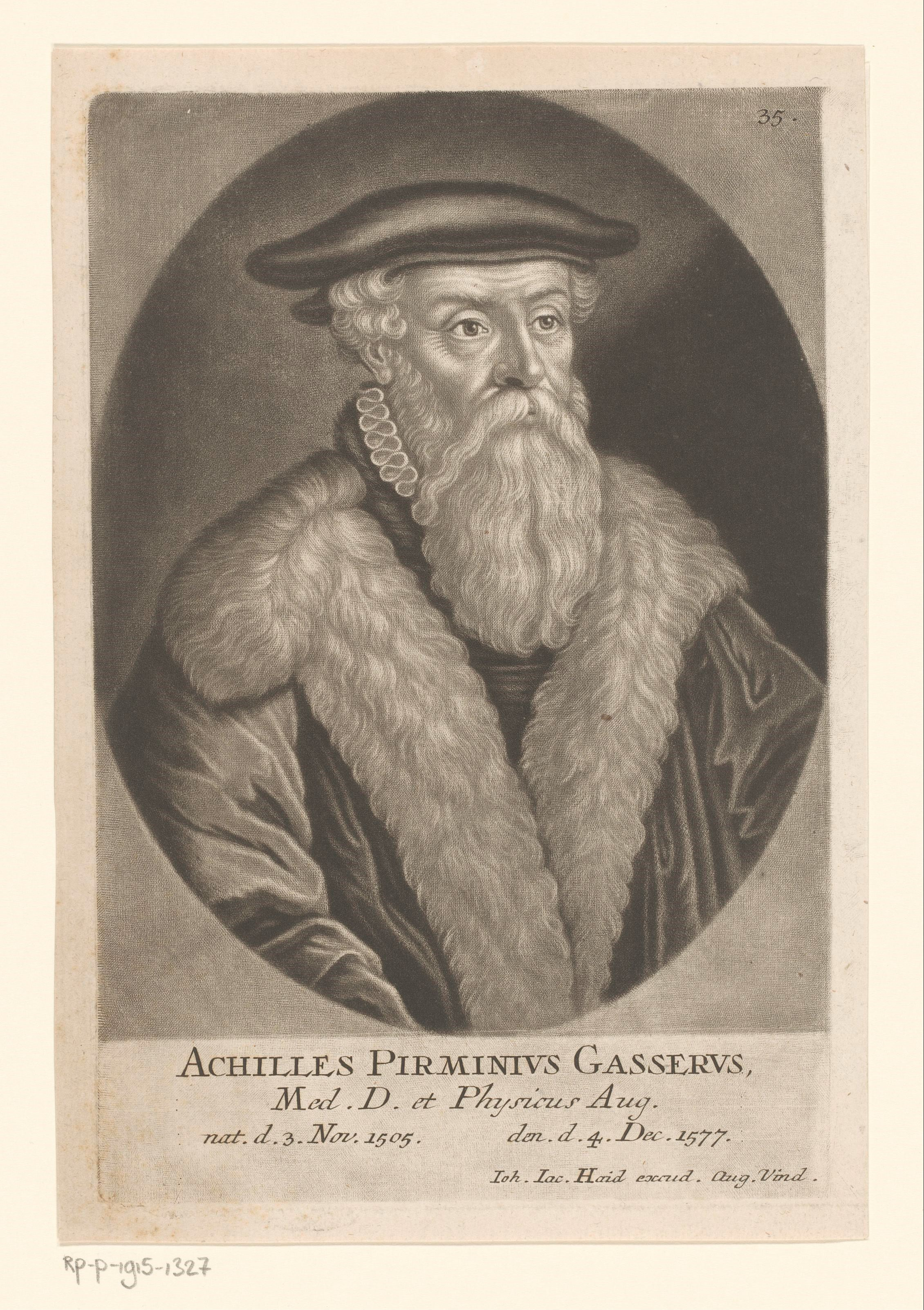
- Born: 3 November 1505; Imperial Free City of Lindau, Holy Roman Empire
- Died: 4 December 1577 (aged 72); Mixed Imperial City of Augsburg, Holy Roman Empire
- Known for: Comet observations, research on European history and geography
- Scientific career
- Fields: Astronomy; cartography

Achilles Pirmin Gasser (3 November 1505 – 4 December 1577) was a German physician and astrologer. He is now known as a well-connected humanistic scholar, and supporter of both Copernicus and Rheticus.

== Life ==
Born in Lindau, he studied mathematics, history, and philosophy, as well as astronomy. He was a student in Sélestat under Johannes Sapidus; he also attended universities in Wittenberg, Vienna, Montpellier, and Avignon.

In 1528, German cartographer Sebastian Münster appealed to scientists across the Holy Roman Empire to assist him with his description of Germany. Gassar accepted this and was later recognized by Münster as a close collaborator for his cartography of the country.

Rheticus lost his physician father Georg Iserin in 1528 when he was executed on sorcery charges. Gasser later took over the practice in Feldkirch, in 1538; he taught Rheticus some astrology, and helped his education, in particular by writing to the University of Wittenberg on his behalf.

When Rheticus printed his Narratio prima—the first published account of the Copernican heliocentric system—in 1540 (Danzig), he sent Gasser a copy. Gasser then undertook a second edition (1541, Basel) with his own introduction in the form of a letter from Gasser to Georg Vogelin of Konstanz. The second edition (1566, Basel) of De revolutionibus orbium coelestium contained the Narratio Prima with this introduction by Gasser.

== Works ==
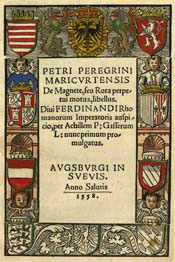
Title page of the De magnete in the 1558 edition by Gasser

He prepared the first edition (Augsburg, 1558) of the Epistola de magnete of Pierre de Maricourt.

Other works include:

- Historiarum et Chronicorum totius mundi epitome (1532)
- Prognosticon (1544) dedicated to Thomas Venatorius
- Edition of the Evangelienbuch of Otfried of Weissenburg. His edition did not appear until 1571, under the name of Matthias Flacius who had taken over.
- Observations on comets

Gasser belonged with Flacius to the humanist circle around Kaspar von Niedbruck, concerned with the recovery of monastic manuscripts. Others in the group were John Bale, Conrad Gesner, Joris Cassander, Johannes Matalius Metellus, and Cornelius Wauters.
