= Narratio Prima =

Book from Georg Joachim Rheticus, first publication of Copernican heliocentrism

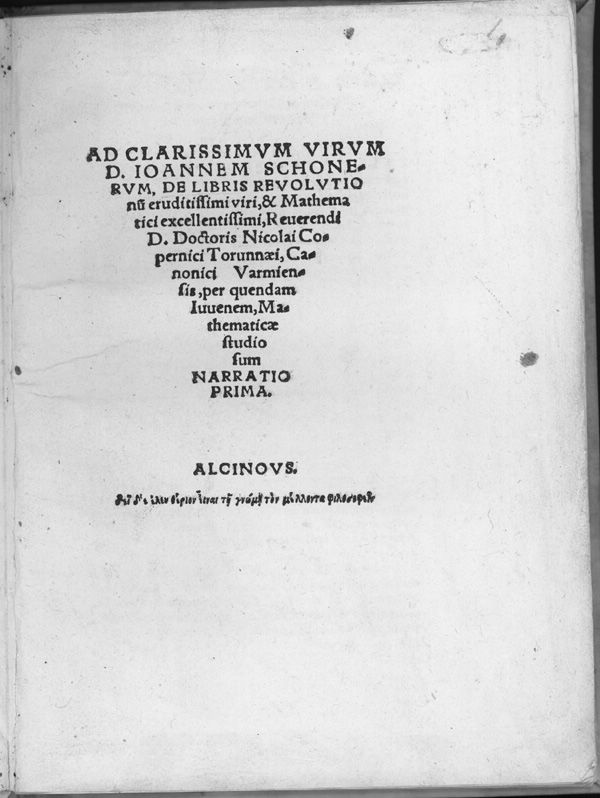
Narratio Prima

De libris revolutionum Copernici narratio prima, usually referred to as Narratio Prima (Latin: First Account), is an abstract of Nicolaus Copernicus' heliocentric theory, written by Georg Joachim Rheticus in 1540. It is an introduction to Copernicus's major work, De revolutionibus orbium coelestium, published in 1543, largely due to Rheticus's instigation. Narratio Prima is the first printed publication of Copernicus's theory.

== History ==
Copernicus, born in 1473 and already well over 60 years old, had never published any astronomical work, as his only publication had been his translation of poems of Theophylact Simocatta, printed in 1509 by Johann Haller. At the same time, he had distributed his ideas among friends, with manuscripts called Commentariolus. In the 1530s, he was urged to publish by many, yet still hesitated when in 1539, Rheticus arrived in Frauenburg (Frombork) to become Copernicus' first and only pupil. Philipp Melanchthon had arranged for Rheticus to visit several astronomers and study with them.

In September 1539 Rheticus went to Danzig (Gdańsk) to visit the mayor who gave Rheticus some financial assistance to publish the Narratio Prima. This Narratio Prima, published by Franz Rhode in Danzig in 1540, is still considered to be the best introduction to Copernicus' De revolutionibus orbium coelestium. As the full title states, the Narratio was published as an open letter to Johannes Schöner of Nuremberg (Nürnberg). It was bundled together with the Encomium Prussiae which praised the spirit of humanism in Prussia.

During his two-year stay in Prussia, Rheticus published works of his own, and in cooperation with Copernicus, in 1542 a treatise on trigonometry which was a preview to the second book of De revolutionibus. Under strong pressure from Rheticus, and having seen the favorable first general reception of the Narratio Prima, Copernicus finally agreed to give the book to his close friend, bishop Tiedemann Giese, to be delivered to Nuremberg for printing by Johannes Petreius under Rheticus's supervision.

Later editions of Narratio Prima were printed in Basel, in 1541 by Robert Winter, and in 1566 by Henricus Petrus in connection with the second edition of De revolutionibus. In 1597 when Johannes Kepler's first book Mysterium Cosmographicum was prepared for publication in Tübingen, his advisor Michael Maestlin decided to include Rheticus' Narratio Prima following Kepler's text, as a supplementary explanation of heliocentric theory.

== Bibliography ==
- Rheticus: Narratio prima de libris revolutionum Copernici, Danzig 1540
- Richard S. Westfall, Indiana University. Rheticus, George Joachim. "Catalog of the Scientific Community of the 16th and 17th Centuries," The Galileo Project.
- Dennis Danielson (2006). The First Copernican: Georg Joachim Rheticus and the Rise of the Copernican Revolution. Walker & Company, New York. ISBN 0-8027-1530-3
- Karl Heinz Burmeister: Georg Joachim Rhetikus 1514–1574. Bd. I–III. Guido Pressler Verlag, Wiesbaden 1967.
- Stefan Deschauer: Die Arithmetik-Vorlesung des Georg Joachim Rheticus, Wittenberg 1536: eine kommentierte Edition der Handschrift X-278 (8) der Estnischen Akademischen Bibliothek; Augsburg: Rauner, 2003; ISBN 3-936905-00-2
- R. Hooykaas: G. J. Rheticus’ Treatise on holy scripture and the motion of the earth / with transl., annotations, commentary and additional chapters on Ramus-Rheticus and the development of the problem before 1650; Amsterdam: North-Holland, 1984
