= Franz Rhode =

German printer

Franz Rhode (also Franciscus Rhodus) (died 1559) was a German printer of the 16th century.

Having been active in Marburg between 1529 and 1534, he went to Hamburg in 1536 to print Latin works of the theologist Urbanus Rhegius from Celle. In 1537 he moved his office to Danzig (Gdańsk) in Kingdom of Poland, where he published the Wisby'sches Waterrecht (Maritime Laws of Wisbuy) in 1538, and established himself as the printer of the council and gymnasium of the town. In the winter of 1539/1540, he printed the Narratio Prima of the young German astronomer Georg Joachim Rheticus, an introduction to Nicolaus Copernicus' major work, De revolutionibus orbium coelestium, which was finally published in 1543.

Afterwards, several printers named Rhode were active in Danzig, probably sons of Franz: Jacob, who in 1591 printed the Hansisches Seerecht (Hanseatic sea law), Martin, and another, younger Jacob. In Danzig, they were regarded as scholars, as in that time, many printers had a scientific background.
