= Diego López de Zúñiga (theologian) =

Spanish humanist and biblical scholar (c.1470–1531)

To be distinguished from Diego de Zúñiga of Salamanca (1536–1597)

Diego López de Zúñiga, Latin: Jacobus Lopis Stunica (ca. 1470 in Estremadura - 1531 in Naples) was a Spanish humanist and biblical scholar noted for his controversies with Erasmus and Lefèvre d'Etaples and leadership of the team of editors for the Complutensian Polyglot Bible. He was born around 1470 in Extremadura, to an aristocratic family; his brother Íñigo López de Mendoza y Zúñiga was a diplomat for Charles V of Spain.

He was a pupil of Arias Barbosa at the University of Salamanca. In 1502 Cardinal Jiménez de Cisneros recruited him for the team that would produce the Complutensian Polyglot.

López de Zúñiga controverted Erasmus on a number of points of Biblical translation. A contemporary view is that, while at times he defended the Latin Vulgate excessively, he made valid points in some other cases and showed up deficiencies of Erasmus who lacked the same command of Hebrew and Aramaic.

== Works ==
- Annotationes Iacobi Lopidis Stunicae contra Erasmum Roterodamum in defensionem tralationis Novi Testamenti
