= Georg Joachim Rheticus =

Austrian astronomer and mathematician (1514–1576)

Rheticus
- Born: 16 February 1514; Feldkirch, Archduchy of Austria, Holy Roman Empire (present-day Austria)
- Died: 4 December 1574 (aged 60); Kassa, Kingdom of Hungary, Habsburg monarchy (present-day Slovakia)
- Education: University of Wittenberg
- Known for: Trigonometric tables
- Scientific career
- Fields: Mathematician and astronomer
- Workplaces: University of Wittenberg (1536–42); University of Leipzig (1542–51)
- Academic advisors: Nicolaus Copernicus
- Notable students: Sebastian Dietrich, Valentin Otto, Caspar Peucer, Valentin Steinmetz

Georg Joachim de Porris, also known as Rheticus (/ˈrɛtɪkəs/; 16 February 1514 – 4 December 1574), was a mathematician, astronomer, cartographer, navigational-instrument maker, medical practitioner, and teacher. He is perhaps best known for his trigonometric tables and as Nicolaus Copernicus's sole pupil. He facilitated the publication of his master's De revolutionibus orbium coelestium (On the Revolutions of the Heavenly Spheres).

== Surname ==
Rheticus was born at Feldkirch in the Archduchy of Austria. Both his parents, Georg Iserin and Thomasina de Porris, were of Italian heritage and possessed considerable wealth, his father being the town physician as well as a government official. He was educated by his father until the age of 14 when Georg (Iserin) abused the trust of many of his patients, stealing belongings and money from their homes. In 1528 he was convicted and executed for his crimes, and as a result his family was stripped of their surname.

The family adopted the mother's maiden name: de Porris. Later as a student at the University of Wittenberg, Georg Joachim adopted the toponym Rheticus, a form of the Latin name for his home region, Rhaetia, a Roman province that had included parts of Austria, Switzerland and Germany. In the matriculation list for the University of Leipzig his family name, de Porris, is translated into German as von Lauchen. The lunar crater Rhaeticus as well as asteroid 15949 Rhaeticus were named for him.

== Patrons ==
After Georg Iserin's death, Achilles Gasser took over his medical practice, helping Rheticus to continue his studies and supporting him, eventually going so far as to furnish him with a letter of introduction to Philipp Melanchthon, a theologian and educator who would become a major patron, having reorganized the whole educational system of the Lutheran Protestant parts of Germany, reforming and founding several new universities during the Reformation. This relationship in particular would soon serve him well as Melanchton possibly chose him specifically for the University of Wittenberg. Rheticus studied at Feldkirch, Zürich and Wittenberg where he received his M.A. in 1536, after which Melanchthon appointed Rheticus as professor of the lower mathematics, arithmetic and astronomy, at the Wittenberg University.

Two years later, Melanchthon arranged a two-year leave for Rheticus to study with noted astronomers. Leaving Wittenberg in October 1538, he first went to Nuremberg to visit the professor of mathematics at the Eigidien Oberschule, Johannes Schöner. In Nuremberg he also made the acquaintance of other mathematicians such as Georg Hartmann and Thomas Venatorius as well as the printer-publisher Johannes Petreius. During his journey, probably in Nuremberg, Rheticus heard of Copernicus and decided to seek him out. It is unknown whether he had access to Copernicus' Commentariolus, an unsigned, unpublished outline of Copernicus' revolutionary heliocentric theory that Copernicus distributed to friends and colleagues three decades before he published De revolutionibus, prior to this or perhaps on consulting Schöner who is believed to have persuaded him. From Johannes Petreius Rheticus was given works by Regiomontanus and others, intended as presents for Copernicus. He went on to Peter Apian at the University of Ingolstadt and Joachim Camerarius at the University of Tübingen, then to his hometown when Rheticus would present Gasser with an edition of Sacrobosco. From Feldkirch he set out on his journey to visit Copernicus in Frombork.

== Copernicus ==
Geocentric (upper) and Heliocentric (lower) views of the Solar System.

In May 1539, Rheticus arrived in Frauenburg (Frombork), where he spent two years with Copernicus. Despite the effort invested thus far, Copernicus had not finished a manuscript of his work, apparently choosing to not seek publication, presumably due to issues reconciling such findings with the historically held religious attitudes at the time. Eventually though, he would be swayed to allow Rheticus to author an abstract on his research despite being well aware of the criticism and controversy it could bring. Only following its reception, widely considered the best introduction to Copernicus' work, would he then give Rheticus further permission to edit and publish his work in full. In this, Rheticus would prove integral in utilizing previously forged social connections as well as strategically cultivating new ones just to bring it to publication. It was thus only because of this fortuitous meeting that the heliocentric theory, a concept that would still not be accepted for decades to come, would ultimately be brought to light.

In September 1539, Rheticus went to Danzig (Gdańsk) to visit the mayor, who gave him financial assistance to publish his Narratio Prima (First Report) of Copernicus' forthcoming treatise. Rhode in Danzig published Narratio Prima in 1540. Unexpectedly, it also contains a eulogy of Prussia. In it, the origins, flora, and fauna of the country are discussed as well as descriptions for several of its cities, regarding their commerce and history, demonstrating that his travels frequently served a twin purpose. While in Danzig, Rheticus interviewed maritime pilots to learn about their problems in navigation. Rheticus also visited Copernicus' friend Tiedemann Giese, who was Bishop of Chełmno (Culm) and further encouraged him to publish the former's work. At some point, he would additionally become a patron.

In August 1541, Rheticus presented both a copy of Chorographia (containing a systematic approach to the preparation of maps, distinguishing chorography from geography, discussing various methods of cartographic survey by the use of the compass as well as improvements to the aforementioned instrument) and Tabula chorographica auff Preussen und etliche umbliegende lender (Map of Prussia and Neighboring Lands) to Albert, Duke of Prussia. Knowing the duke had been trying to compute the exact time of sunrise, Rheticus made an instrument that determined the length of the day, and through this favor obtained from him a recommendation to Wittenberg that De revolutionibus be published. Albrecht asked Rheticus to end his travels and return to his teaching position. Rheticus returned to the University of Wittenberg in October 1541, then elected dean of the Faculty of Arts as well as joining the theological faculty. In May 1542, he traveled to Nürnberg to supervise the printing by Johannes Petreius of the first edition of De revolutionibus in which he included tables of trigonometric functions he had calculated in further support of Copernicus' work, but had to leave in fall to take a position at the University of Leipzig, and Andreas Osiander replaced him. A theologian, Osiander would use this role to add an unauthorized preface in a would-be attempt to avoid censorship, explicitly describing the theory discussed therein as a model of pure hypothesis predicated on assumptions that are coincidentally consistent with the calculations. Towards this, Rheticus would allegedly deface every such copy he came across. Copernicus' major work would eventually be published shortly before his death in 1543.

In a work now properly attributed to Rheticus tentatively titled Epistolae de Terrae Motu (Letter on the Motion of the Earth), he attempts to reconcile Copernicanism with scripture by employing St. Augustine's principle of accommodation. According to historian Robert Westman, the Epistolae or also known as the Opusculum, published posthumously and anonymously in 1651, demonstrates that Copernicus and Rheticus recognized the problem of conflict between their finding of earthly motion and biblical scripture, and had therefore developed a systematic defense of compatibility. Written in a moderate tone, he would suggest that the bible only contains that which is necessary for salvation, in doctrine and ethical instruction. Considering this tenet, scripture would then lack reference to any specific matter that may be studied by science, such as the movement of the earth with respect to the sun, with the exception being those facts of nature outside mankind's ability to investigate. Rheticus would further argue that biblical language was written in terms meant to be readily comprehensible to a wide audience:

It borrows a kind of discourse, a habit of speech, and a method of teaching from popular usage.

— Rheticus describing scripture's apparent conflict with planetary motion in his Epistolae de Terrae Motu (posthumous).

While relying heavily upon citations to appease religious authorities, Rheticus may have nevertheless refrained from publishing the work in his life in order to avoid angering more conservative Protestants such as Melanchthon.

== Criminal history ==
In 1542, Rheticus on the recommendation of Joachim Camerarius in conjunction with Melanchthon was then appointed professor of higher mathematics at Leipzig. Rheticus ended up taking another leave of absence in 1545, departing for Italy although the specifics of his itinerary remain unknown. In 1546–47, he would suffer from some unspecified severe mental disorder in Lindau, but recovered enough to return to teaching at Constance towards the latter. By 1551, he would publish some of his work in mathematics, trigonometric tables containing all six functions defined directly in terms of right triangles instead of circles, the first of its kind. While serving in this position, he simultaneously pursued other scholarly interests such as releasing a calendar and ephemeris in 1552 as well as the subsequent year. Then in 1552, Rheticus was found guilty of raping the son of Hans Meusel, a merchant, though the exact nature of this encounter has been called into question. According to Meusel, Rheticus "plied him with a strong drink, until he was inebriated; and finally did with violence overcome him and practice upon him the shameful and cruel vice of sodomy". He fled following this accusation, for a time residing in Chemnitz before eventually moving on to Prague. Rheticus was then found guilty in his trial in absentia and consequently exiled from Leipzig for 101 years as well as having his possessions impounded. As a result, he would come to lose the support of many long-time benefactors including Melanchthon.

== Later years ==
Often overshadowed by the facilitative role he played in Copernicus' publications, Rheticus would continue to pursue other scientific endeavors following his exile. 1551–52 found him studying medicine at the University of Prague, primarily applying his skills toward treatment of patients without any appreciable contributions to the field. Then in 1553, he was offered a position in mathematics at Vienna where he would travel to ultimately decline the appointment, instead relocating to Kraków in 1554 for the next 20 years as a practicing doctor. While there, he continued his work within mathematics and astronomy, further compiling his calculations of trigonomic functions with funding from Emperor Maximilian II with the aid of numerous assistants. The canon of Warmia Georg Donner and the bishop of Warmia Johannes Dantiscus were both patrons of Rheticus. Rheticus was also commissioned to make a staff for King Sigismund II of Poland, while he held a position as teacher in Kraków for many years. From there he went to Košice in the Kingdom of Hungary, where he died.

== Trigonometry ==
For much of his life, Rheticus displayed a passion for the study of triangles, the branch of mathematics now called trigonometry. In 1542 he had the trigonometric sections of Copernicus' De revolutionibis published separately under the title De lateribus et angulis triangulorum (On the Sides and Angles of Triangles). In 1551 Rheticus produced a tract titled Canon of the Science of Triangles, the first publication of six-function trigonometric tables (although the word trigonometry was not yet coined). This pamphlet was to be an introduction to Rheticus' greatest work, a full set of tables to be used in angular astronomical measurements.

At his death, the Science of Triangles was still unfinished. However, paralleling his own relationship with Copernicus, Rheticus had acquired a student from Wittenberg who sought him out. Valentinus Otho, devoted to completing his teacher's work, oversaw the hand computation of approximately 100,000 ratios to at least ten decimal places. When completed in 1596, the volume, Opus palatinum de triangulis, filled nearly 1,500 pages. Its tables were accurate enough to be used in astronomical computation into the early twentieth century.

== In popular culture ==
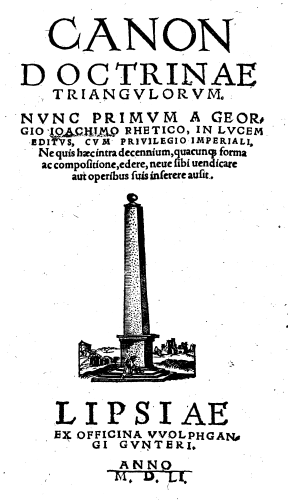
Frontpage of Canon Doctrinae Triangulorum

Rheticus narrates the third part of John Banville's 1975 novel Doctor Copernicus, relating how he convinced Copernicus to publish the book. The novel itself is less about Copernicus's work than about his life and the 16th century world in which he lived.

The episode "Claudia" of the U.S. science fiction series Warehouse 13 references a teleportation device in the form of a compass said to have been built by Rheticus.

Rheticus is referenced several times in the song "Like Rheticus" on the 2004 album Place by British songwriter Owen Tromans.

Dava Sobel's 2011 book A More Perfect Heaven: How Copernicus Revolutionized the Cosmos features a fictional play about Rheticus' visit to Copernicus, sandwiched between chapters about the visit's pre-history and post-history.

== Works ==
- Narratio prima de libris revolutionum Copernici (1540)
- Tabula chorographica auff Preussen und etliche umbliegende lender (1541)
- De lateribus et angulis triangulorum (with Copernicus; 1542)
- Ephemerides novae (1550)
- Canon doctrinae triangulorum (1551)
- Epistolae de Terrae Motu (posthumous)
