= De revolutionibus orbium coelestium =

1543 book by Copernicus describing his heliocentric theory of the universe

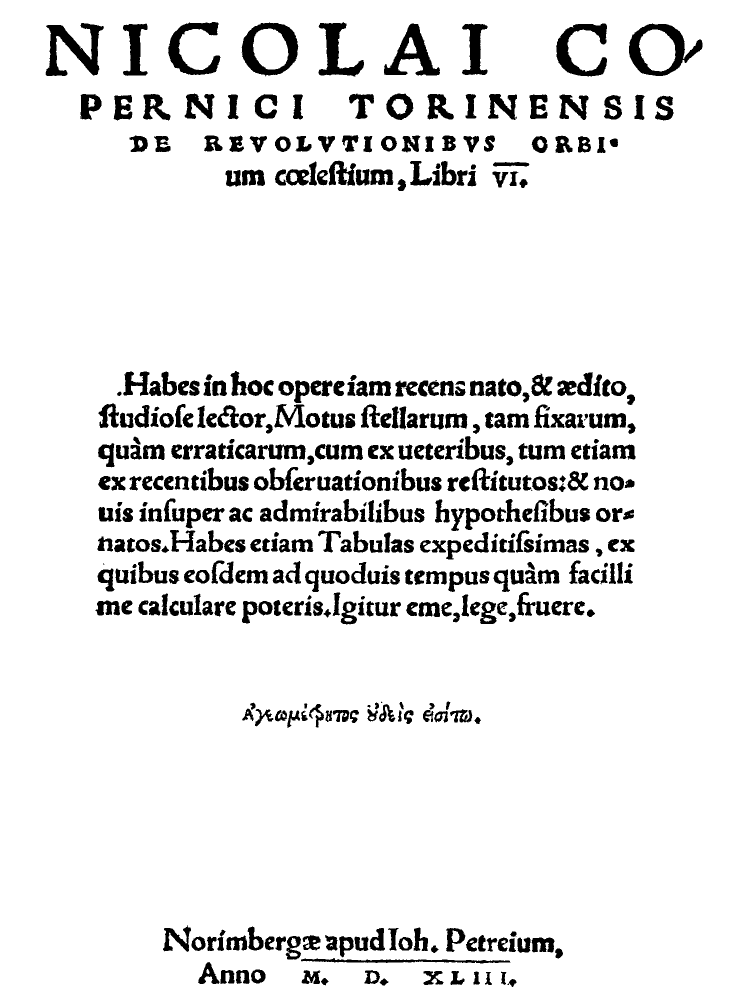
- Original 1543 Nuremberg edition
- Author: Nicolaus Copernicus
- Language: Latin
- Subject: Astronomy
- Publisher: Johannes Petreius
- Publication date: 1543
- Publication place: Nuremberg, Holy Roman Empire
- Pages: 405
- Original text: De revolutionibus orbium coelestium at Latin Wikisource

De revolutionibus orbium coelestium (On the Revolutions of the Heavenly Spheres) is the seminal work on the heliocentric theory of the astronomer Nicolaus Copernicus (1473–1543 CE). The book, first printed in 1543 CE in Nuremberg, Holy Roman Empire, offered an alternative model of the universe to Ptolemy's geocentric system, which had been widely accepted since ancient times.

== History ==
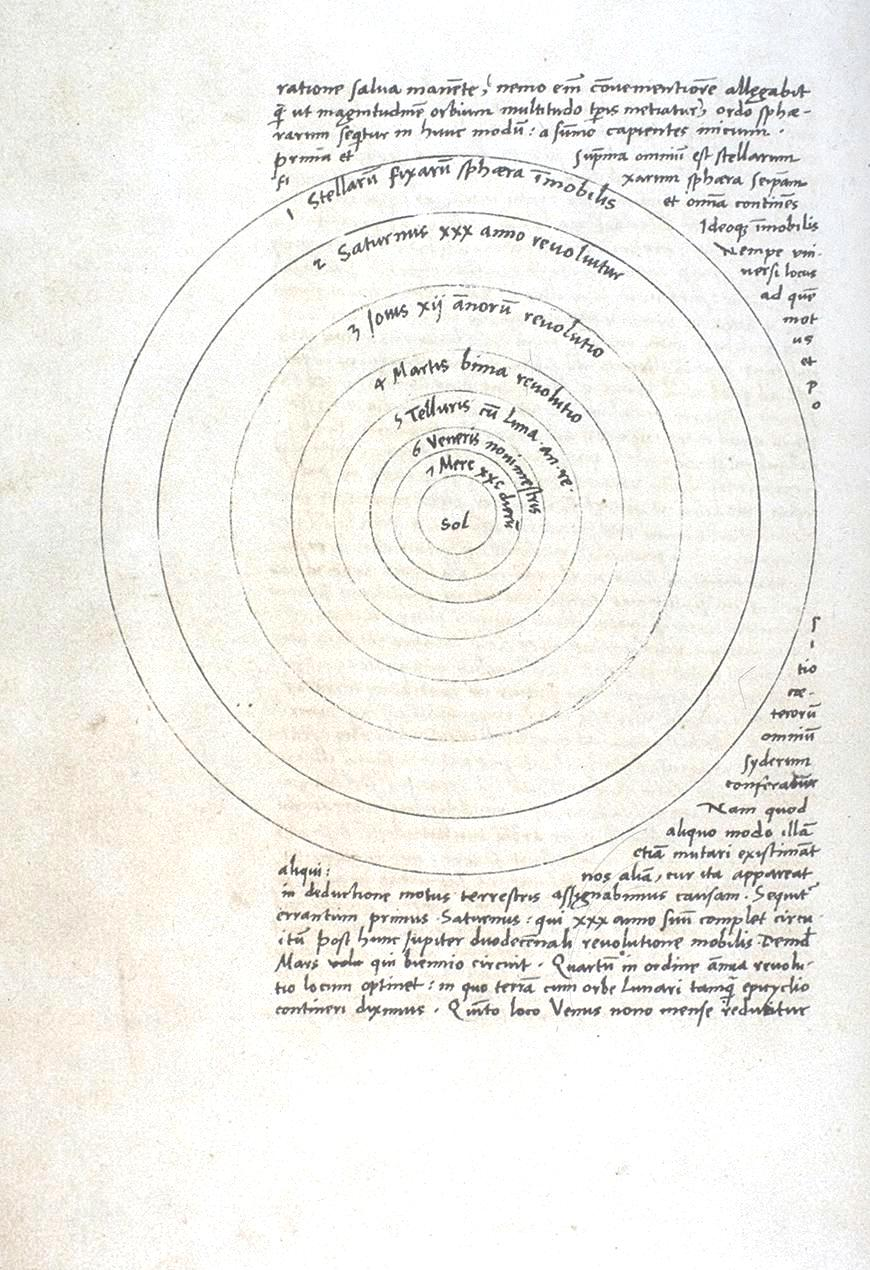
Order of the heavenly spheres annotated with periods of revolution from Chapter 10 of Copernicus' manuscript

Latin: In medio uero omnium residet Sol (English: 'But the Sun resides at the centre of everything'), from the printed book page corresponding with the above diagram.

Copernicus initially outlined his system in a short, untitled, anonymous manuscript that he distributed to several friends, referred to as the Commentariolus. A physician's library list dating to 1514 includes a manuscript whose description matches the Commentariolus, so Copernicus must have begun work on his new system by that time. Most historians believe that he wrote the Commentariolus after his return from Italy, possibly only after 1510. At this time, Copernicus anticipated that he could reconcile the motion of the Earth with the perceived motions of the planets easily, with fewer motions than were necessary in the version of the Ptolemaic system current at the time. Among other techniques, the heliocentric Copernican model made use of the Urdi Lemma developed in the 13th century by the Arab astronomer Mu'ayyad al-Din al-'Urdi, the first of the Maragha astronomers to develop a geocentric but non-Ptolemaic model of planetary motion.

Observations of Mercury by Bernhard Walther (1430–1504) of Nuremberg, a pupil of Regiomontanus, were made available to Copernicus by Johannes Schöner, 45 observations in total, 14 of them with longitude and latitude. Copernicus used three of them in De revolutionibus, giving only longitudes, and erroneously attributing them to Schöner. Copernicus' values differed slightly from the ones published by Schöner in 1544 in Observationes XXX annorum a I. Regiomontano et B. Walthero Norimbergae habitae, [4°, Norimb. 1544].

A manuscript of De revolutionibus in Copernicus' own hand has survived. After his death, it was given to his pupil, Rheticus, who for publication had only been given a copy without annotations. Via Heidelberg, it ended up in Prague, where it was rediscovered and studied in the 19th century. Close examination of the manuscript, including the different types of paper used, helped scholars construct an approximate timetable for its composition. Apparently Copernicus began by making a few astronomical observations to provide new data to perfect his models. He may have begun writing the book while still engaged in observations. By the 1530s a substantial part of the book was complete, but Copernicus hesitated to publish. In 1536, Cardinal Nikolaus von Schönberg wrote to Copernicus and urged him to publish his manuscript.

In 1539, Georg Joachim Rheticus, a young mathematician from Wittenberg, arrived in Frauenburg (Frombork) to study with him. Rheticus read Copernicus' manuscript and immediately wrote a non-technical summary of its main theories in the form of an open letter addressed to Schöner, his astrology teacher in Nürnberg; he published this letter as the Narratio Prima in Danzig in 1540. Rheticus' friend and mentor Achilles Gasser published a second edition of the Narratio in Basel in 1541. Due to its friendly reception, Copernicus finally agreed to publication of more of his main work—in 1542, a treatise on trigonometry, which was taken from the second book of the still unpublished De revolutionibus. Rheticus published it in Copernicus' name.

Under strong pressure from Rheticus, and having seen that the first general reception of his work had not been unfavorable, Copernicus finally agreed to give the book to his close friend, Bishop Tiedemann Giese, to be delivered to Rheticus in Wittenberg for printing by Johannes Petreius at Nürnberg (Nuremberg). It was published just before Copernicus' death, in 1543.

Copernicus kept a copy of his manuscript which, sometime after his death, was sent to Rheticus in the attempt to produce an authentic, unaltered version of the book. The plan failed but the copy was found during the 18th century and was published later. It is kept at the Jagiellonian University Library in Kraków, where it remains bearing the library number BJ 10 000.

== Contents ==
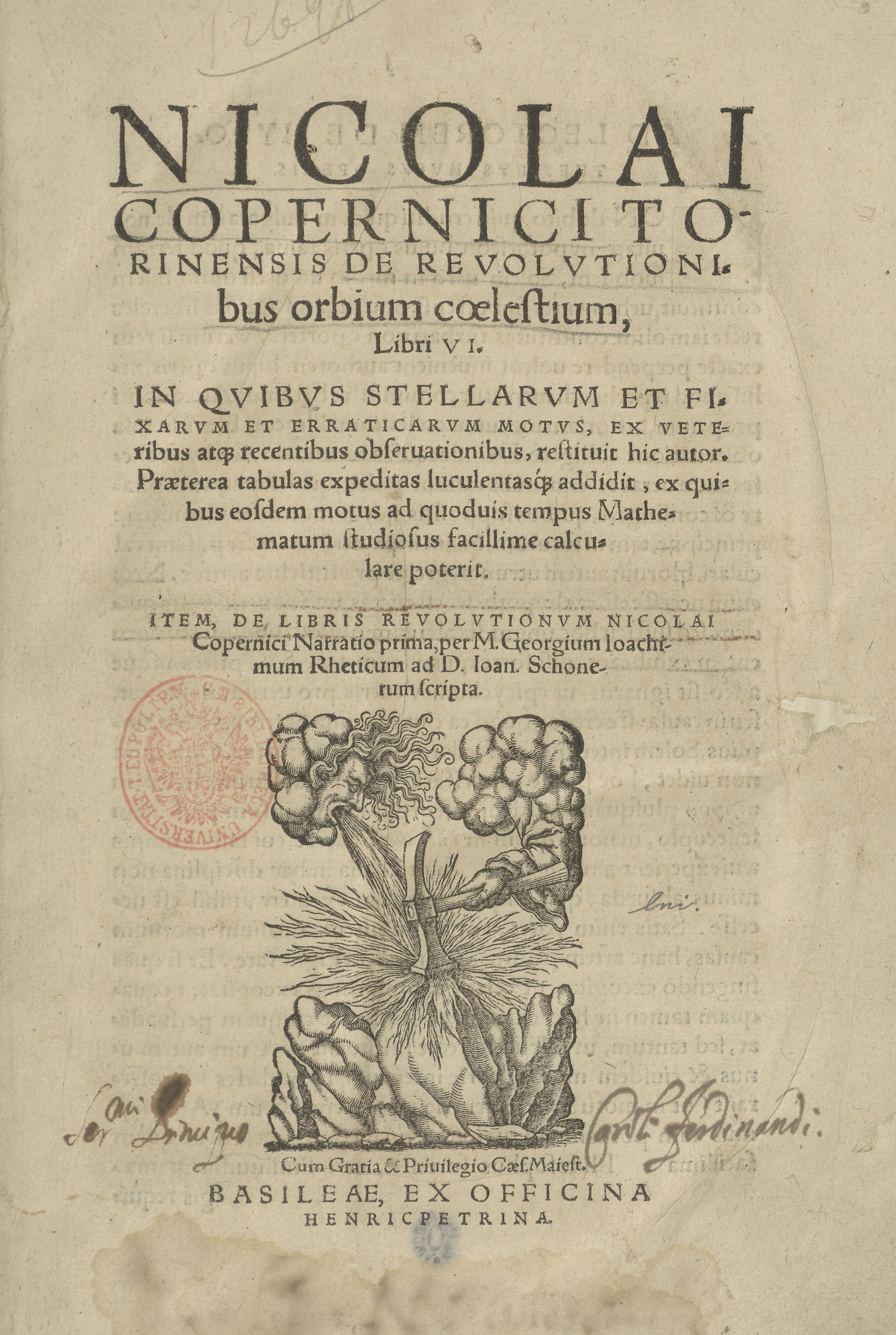
Title page, 2nd edition, Basel, Officina Henricpetrina, 1566

From the first edition, Copernicus' book was prefixed with an anonymous preface which argues that the following is a calculus consistent with the observations, and cannot resolve philosophical truths. Only later was this revealed to be the unauthorized interjection by Lutheran preacher Andreas Osiander, who lived in Nuremberg when the first edition was printed there. This is followed by Copernicus' own preface, where he dedicates his work to Pope Paul III and appeals to the latter's skill as a mathematician to recognize the truth of Copernicus' hypothesis.

De revolutionibus is divided into six "books" (sections or parts), following closely the layout of Ptolemy's Almagest which it updated and replaced:

- Book I chapters 1–11 are a general vision of the heliocentric theory, and a summarized exposition of his cosmology. The world (heavens) is spherical, as is the Earth, and the land and water make a single globe. The celestial bodies, including the Earth, have regular circular and everlasting movements. The Earth rotates on its axis and around the Sun. Answers to why the ancients thought the Earth was central. The order of the planets around the Sun and their periodicity. Chapters 12–14 give theorems for chord geometry as well as a table of chords.
- Book II describes the principles of spherical astronomy as a basis for the arguments developed in the following books and gives a comprehensive catalogue of the fixed stars.
- Book III describes his work on the precession of the equinoxes and treats the apparent movements of the Sun and related phenomena.
- Book IV is a similar description of the Moon and its orbital movements.
- Book V explains how to calculate the positions of the wandering stars based on the heliocentric model and gives tables for the five planets.
- Book VI deals with the digression in latitude from the ecliptic of the five planets.

Copernicus argued that the universe comprised eight spheres. The outermost consisted of motionless, fixed stars, with the Sun motionless at the center. The known planets revolved about the Sun, each in its own sphere, in the order: Mercury, Venus, Earth, Mars, Jupiter, Saturn. The Moon, however, revolved in its sphere around the Earth. What appeared to be the daily revolution of the Sun and fixed stars around the Earth was actually the Earth's daily rotation on its own axis.

Copernicus adhered to one of the standard beliefs of his time, namely that the motions of celestial bodies must be composed of uniform circular motions. For this reason, he was unable to account for the observed apparent motion of the planets without retaining a complex system of epicycles similar to those of the Ptolemaic system. Despite Copernicus' adherence to this aspect of ancient astronomy, his radical shift from a geocentric to a heliocentric cosmology was a serious blow to Aristotle's science—and helped usher in the Scientific Revolution.

== Ad lectorem ==
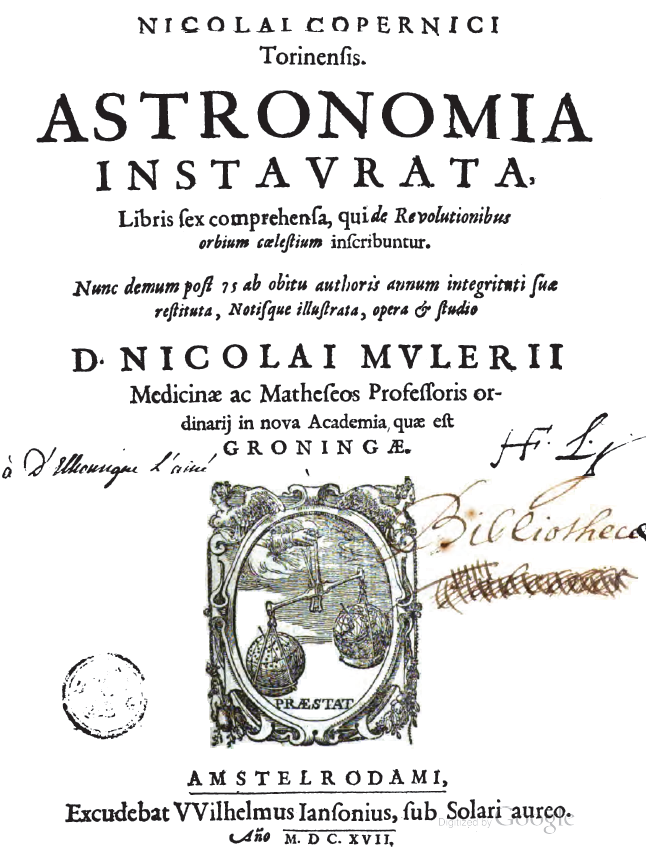
Title page, 3rd ed., Amsterdam, Nicolaus Mulerius, publisher, 1617

Rheticus left Nürnberg to take up his post as professor in Leipzig. Andreas Osiander had taken over the task of supervising the printing and publication. In an effort to reduce the controversial impact of the book Osiander added his own unsigned letter Ad lectorem de hypothesibus huius operis (To the reader concerning the hypotheses of this work) printed in front of Copernicus' preface which was a dedicatory letter to Pope Paul III and which kept the title "Praefatio authoris" (to acknowledge that the unsigned letter was not by the book's author). Osiander's letter stated that Copernicus' system was mathematics intended to aid computation and not an attempt to declare literal truth:

it is the duty of an astronomer to compose the history of the celestial motions through careful and expert study. Then he must conceive and devise the causes of these motions or hypotheses about them. Since he cannot in any way attain to the true causes, he will adopt whatever suppositions enable the motions to be computed correctly ... The present author has performed both these duties excellently. For these hypotheses need not be true nor even probable. On the contrary, if they provide a calculus consistent with the observations, that alone is enough ... For this art, it is quite clear, is completely and absolutely ignorant of the causes of the apparent [movement of the heavens]. And if any causes are devised by the imagination, as indeed very many are, they are not put forward to convince anyone that they are true, but merely to provide a reliable basis for computation. However, since different hypotheses are sometimes offered for one and the same ... the astronomer will take as his first choice that hypothesis which is the easiest to grasp. The philosopher will perhaps rather seek the semblance of the truth. But neither of them will understand or state anything certain, unless it has been divinely revealed to him ... Let no one expect anything certain from astronomy, which cannot furnish it, lest he accept as the truth ideas conceived for another purpose, and depart this study a greater fool than when he entered.

As even Osiander's defenders point out, the Ad lectorem "expresses views on the aim and nature of scientific theories at variance with Copernicus' claims for his own theory". Many view Osiander's letter as a betrayal of science and Copernicus, and an attempt to pass his own thoughts off as those of the book's author. An example of this type of claim can be seen in the Catholic Encyclopedia, which states "Fortunately for him [the dying Copernicus], he could not see what Osiander had done. This reformer, knowing the attitude of Luther and Melanchthon against the heliocentric system ... without adding his own name, replaced the preface of Copernicus by another strongly contrasting in spirit with that of Copernicus."

While Osiander's motives behind the letter have been questioned by many, he has been defended by historian Bruce Wrightsman, who points out he was not an enemy of science. Osiander had many scientific connections including "Johannes Schoner, Rheticus's teacher, whom Osiander recommended for his post at the Nurnberg Gymnasium; Peter Apian of Ingolstadt University; Hieronymous Schreiber...Joachim Camerarius...Erasmus Reinhold...Joachim Rheticus...and finally, Hieronymous Cardan."

The historian Wrightsman put forward that Osiander did not sign the letter because he "was such a notorious [Protestant] reformer whose name was well-known and infamous among Catholics", so that signing would have likely caused negative scrutiny of the work of Copernicus (a loyal Catholic canon and scholar). Copernicus himself had communicated to Osiander his "own fears that his work would be scrutinized and criticized by the 'peripatetics and theologians'," and he had already been in trouble with his bishop, Johannes Dantiscus, on account of his former relationship with his mistress and friendship with Dantiscus's enemy and suspected heretic, Alexander Scultetus. It was also possible that Protestant Nurnberg could fall to the forces of the Holy Roman Emperor and since "the books of hostile theologians could be burned...why not scientific works with the names of hated theologians affixed to them?" Wrightsman also holds that this is why Copernicus did not mention his top student, Rheticus (a Lutheran) in the book's dedication to the Pope.

Osiander's interest in astronomy was theological, hoping for "improving the chronology of historical events and thus providing more accurate apocalyptic interpretations of the Bible... [he shared in] the general awareness that the calendar was not in agreement with astronomical movement and therefore, needed to be corrected by devising better models on which to base calculations." In an era before the telescope, Osiander (like most of the era's mathematical astronomers) attempted to bridge the "fundamental incompatibility between Ptolemaic astronomy and Aristotelian physics, and the need to preserve both", by taking an 'instrumentalist' position. Only the handful of "Philosophical purists like the Averroists... demanded physical consistency and thus sought for realist models."

Copernicus was hampered by his insistence on preserving the idea that celestial bodies had to travel in perfect circles — he "was still attached to classical ideas of circular motion around deferents and epicycles, and spheres." This was particularly troubling concerning the Earth because he "attached the Earth's axis rigidly to a Sun-centered sphere. The unfortunate consequence was that the terrestrial rotation axis then maintained the same inclination with respect to the Sun as the sphere turned, eliminating the seasons." To explain the seasons, he had to propose a third motion, "an annual contrary conical sweep of the terrestrial axis". It was not until the Great Comet of 1577, which moved as if there were no spheres to crash through, that the idea was challenged. In 1609, Johannes Kepler modified Copernicus' theory by stating that the planets orbit the Sun not in circles, but ellipses. Only after Kepler's refinement of Copernicus' theory was the need for deferents and epicycles abolished.

In his work, Copernicus "used conventional, hypothetical devices like epicycles...as all astronomers had done since antiquity. ...hypothetical constructs solely designed to 'save the phenomena' and aid computation". Ptolemy's theory contained a hypothesis about the epicycle of Venus that was viewed as absurd if seen as anything other than a geometrical device (its brightness and distance should have varied greatly, but they don't). "In spite of this defect in Ptolemy's theory, Copernicus' hypothesis predicts approximately the same variations." Because of the use of similar terms and similar deficiencies, Osiander could see "little technical or physical truth-gain" between one system and the other. It was this attitude towards technical astronomy that had allowed it to "function since antiquity, despite its inconsistencies with the principles of physics and the philosophical objections of Averroists."

Writing Ad lectorem, Osiander was influenced by Pico della Mirandola's idea that humanity "orders [an intellectual] cosmos out of the chaos of opinions." From Pico's writings, Osiander "learned to extract and synthesize insights from many sources without becoming the slavish follower of any of them." The effect of Pico on Osiander was tempered by the influence of Nicholas of Cusa and his idea of coincidentia oppositorum. Rather than having Pico's focus on human effort, Osiander followed Cusa's idea that understanding the Universe and its Creator only came from divine inspiration rather than intellectual organization. From these influences, Osiander held that in the area of philosophical speculation and scientific hypothesis there are "no heretics of the intellect", but when one gets past speculation into truth-claims the Bible is the ultimate measure. By holding that Copernicianism was mathematical speculation, Osiander held that it would be silly to hold it up against the accounts of the Bible.

Pico's influence on Osiander did not escape Rheticus, who reacted strongly against the Ad lectorem. As historian Robert S. Westman puts it, "The more profound source of Rheticus's ire however, was Osiander's view of astronomy as a disciple fundamentally incapable of knowing anything with certainty. For Rheticus, this extreme position surely must have resonated uncomfortably with Pico della Mirandola's attack on the foundations of divinatory astrology."

In his Disputations, Pico had made a devastating attack on astrology. Because those who were making astrological predictions relied on astronomers to tell them where the planets were, they also became a target. Pico held that since astronomers who calculate planetary positions could not agree among themselves, how were they to be held as reliable? While Pico could bring into concordance writers like Aristotle, Plato, Plotinus, Averroes, Avicenna, and Aquinas, the lack of consensus he saw in astronomy was a proof to him of its fallibility alongside astrology. Pico pointed out that the astronomers' instruments were imprecise and any imperfection of even a degree made them worthless for astrology, people should not trust astrologists because they should not trust the numbers from astronomers. Pico pointed out that astronomers couldn't even tell where the Sun appeared in the order of the planets as they orbited the Earth (some put it close to the Moon, others among the planets). How, Pico asked, could astrologists possibly claim they could read what was going on when the astronomers they relied on could offer no precision on even basic questions?

As Westman points out, to Rheticus "it would seem that Osiander now offered new grounds for endorsing Pico's conclusions: not merely was the disagreement among astronomers grounds for mistrusting the sort of knowledge that they produced, but now Osiander proclaimed that astronomers might construct a world deduced from (possibly) false premises. Thus the conflict between Piconian skepticism and secure principles for the science of the stars was built right into the complex dedicatory apparatus of De Revolutionibus itself." According to the notes of Michael Maestlin, "Rheticus...became embroiled in a very bitter wrangle with the printer [over the Ad lectorem]. Rheticus...suspected Osiander had prefaced the work; if he knew this for certain, he declared, he would rough up the fellow so violently that in future he would mind his own business."

Objecting to the Ad lectorem, Tiedemann Giese urged the Nuremberg city council to issue a correction, but this was not done, and the matter was forgotten. Jan Broscius, a supporter of Copernicus, also despaired of the Ad lectorem, writing "Ptolemy's hypothesis is the earth rests. Copernicus' hypothesis is that the earth is in motion. Can either, therefore, be true? ... Indeed, Osiander deceives much with that preface of his ... Hence, someone may well ask: How is one to know which hypothesis is truer, the Ptolemaic or the Copernican?"

Petreius had sent a copy to Hieronymus Schreiber, an astronomer from Nürnberg who had substituted for Rheticus as professor of mathematics in Wittenberg while Rheticus was in Nürnberg supervising the printing. Schreiber, who died in 1547, left in his copy of the book a note about Osiander's authorship. Via Michael Mästlin, this copy came to Johannes Kepler, who discovered what Osiander had done and methodically demonstrated that Osiander had indeed added the foreword. The most knowledgeable astronomers of the time had realized that the foreword was Osiander's doing.

Owen Gingerich gives a slightly different version: Kepler knew of Osiander's authorship since he had read about it in one of Schreiber's annotations in his copy of De Revolutionibus; Maestlin learned of the fact from Kepler. Indeed, Maestlin perused Kepler's book, up to the point of leaving a few annotations in it. However, Maestlin already suspected Osiander, because he had bought his De revolutionibus from the widow of Philipp Apian; examining his books, he had found a note attributing the introduction to Osiander.

Johannes Praetorius (1537–1616), who learned of Osiander's authorship from Rheticus during a visit to him in Kraków, wrote Osiander's name in the margin of the foreword in his copy of De revolutionibus.

All three early editions of De revolutionibus included Osiander's foreword.

== Reception ==
Even before the 1543 publication of De revolutionibus, rumors circulated about its central theses. In one of his Tischreden (Table Talk), Martin Luther is quoted as saying in 1539:

People gave ear to an upstart astrologer who strove to show that the earth revolves, not the heavens or the firmament, the sun and the moon ... This fool wishes to reverse the entire science of astronomy; but sacred Scripture tells us [Joshua 10:13] that Joshua commanded the sun to stand still, and not the earth.

When the book was finally published, demand was low, with an initial print run of 400 failing to sell out. Copernicus had made the book extremely technical, unreadable to all but the most advanced astronomers of the day, allowing it to disseminate into their ranks before stirring great controversy. And, like Osiander, contemporary mathematicians and astronomers encouraged its audience to view it as a useful mathematical model without necessarily being true about causes, thereby somewhat shielding it from accusations of blasphemy.

Among some astronomers, the book "at once took its place as a worthy successor to the Almagest of Ptolemy, which had hitherto been the Alpha and Omega of astronomers". Erasmus Reinhold hailed the work in 1542 and by 1551 had developed the Prutenic Tables ("Prussian Tables"; Latin: Tabulae prutenicae; German: Preußische Tafeln) using Copernicus' methods. The Prutenic Tables, published in 1551, were used as a basis for the calendar reform instituted in 1582 by Pope Gregory XIII. They were also used by sailors and maritime explorers, whose 15th-century predecessors had used Regiomontanus' Table of the Stars. In England, Robert Recorde, John Dee, Thomas Digges and William Gilbert were among those who adopted his position; in Germany, Christian Wurstisen, Christoph Rothmann and Michael Mästlin, the teacher of Johannes Kepler; in Italy, Giambattista Benedetti and Giordano Bruno whilst Franciscus Patricius accepted the rotation of the Earth. In Spain, rules published in 1561 for the curriculum of the University of Salamanca gave students the choice between studying Ptolemy or Copernicus. One of those students, Diego de Zúñiga, published an acceptance of Copernican theory in 1584.

Very soon, nevertheless, Copernicus' theory was attacked with Scripture and with the common Aristotelian proofs. In 1549, Melanchthon, Luther's principal lieutenant, wrote against Copernicus, pointing to the theory's apparent conflict with Scripture and advocating that "severe measures" be taken to restrain the impiety of Copernicans. The works of Copernicus and Zúñiga—the latter for asserting that De revolutionibus was compatible with Catholic faith—were placed on the Index of Forbidden Books by a decree of the Sacred Congregation of the Index of March 5, 1616 (more than 70 years after Copernicus' publication):

This Holy Congregation has also learned about the spreading and acceptance by many of the false Pythagorean doctrine, altogether contrary to the Holy Scripture, that the earth moves and the sun is motionless, which is also taught by Nicholaus Copernicus' De revolutionibus orbium coelestium and by Diego de Zúñiga's In Job ... Therefore, in order that this opinion may not creep any further to the prejudice of Catholic truth, the Congregation has decided that the books by Nicolaus Copernicus [De revolutionibus] and Diego de Zúñiga [In Job] be suspended until corrected.

De revolutionibus was not formally banned but merely withdrawn from circulation, pending "corrections" that would clarify the theory's status as hypothesis. Nine sentences that represented the heliocentric system as certain were to be omitted or changed. After these corrections were prepared and formally approved in 1620 the reading of the book was permitted. But the book was never reprinted with the changes and was available in Catholic jurisdictions only to suitably qualified scholars, by special request. It remained on the Index until 1758, when Pope Benedict XIV (1740–58) removed the uncorrected book from his revised Index.

== Census of copies ==
Arthur Koestler described De revolutionibus as "The Book That Nobody Read" saying the book "was and is an all-time worst seller", despite being reprinted four times. Owen Gingerich, an eminent astronomer and historian of science who has written on both Nicolaus Copernicus and Johannes Kepler, disproved this after a 35-year project to examine every surviving copy of the first two editions. Gingerich showed that nearly all the leading mathematicians and astronomers of the time owned and read the book; however, his analysis of the marginalia shows that almost all of them ignored the cosmology at the beginning of the book and were only interested in Copernicus' new equant-free models of planetary motion in the later chapters. Also, Nicolaus Reimers in 1587 translated the book into German.

Gingerich's efforts and conclusions are recounted in The Book Nobody Read, published in 2004 by Walker & Co. His census included 276 copies of the first edition (by comparison, there are 228 extant copies of Shakespeare's First Folio) and 325 copies of the second. The research behind this book earned its author the Polish government's Order of Merit in 1981. Due largely to Gingerich's scholarship, De revolutionibus has been researched and catalogued better than any other first-edition historic text except for the original Gutenberg Bible. One of the copies now resides at the Archives of the University of Santo Tomas in the Miguel de Benavides Library. In January 2017, a second-edition copy was stolen as part of a heist of rare books from Heathrow Airport and remains unrecovered.

== Editions ==
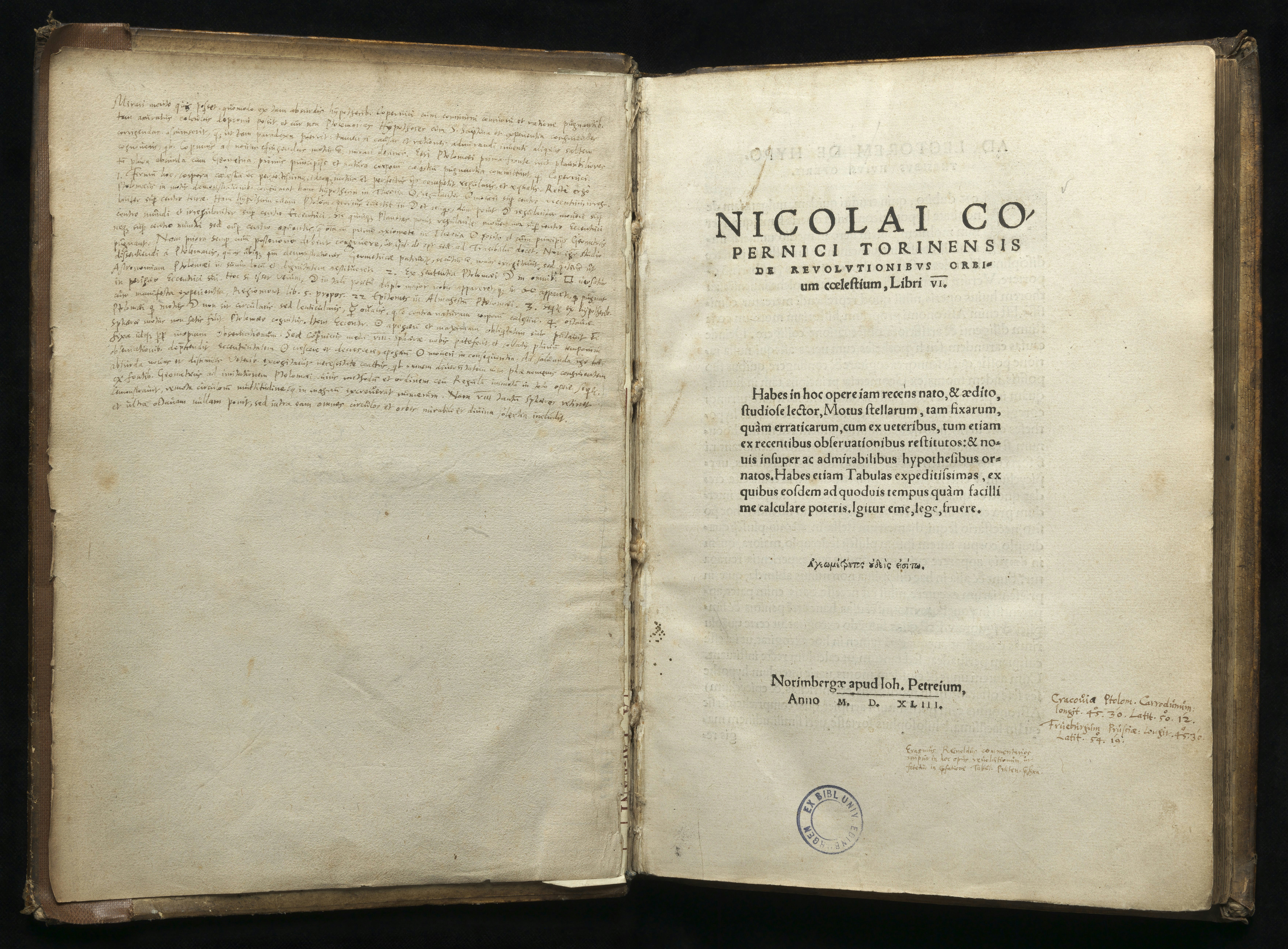
1543 edition held by University of Edinburgh Library

- 1543, Nuremberg, by Johannes Petreius. A copy of this is held by the University of Edinburgh; it had been owned by an astronomer, who filled the pages with scholarly annotations, and subsequently by the Scottish economist Adam Smith. Another copy is held by the Cary Graphic Arts Collection in New York, alongside astronomer Johannes de Sacrobosco's manuscript "De sphaera mundi" (On the Sphere of the World), which supports the earlier Ptolemaic model of the universe. Another 1543 copy is present in the Special Collections of Leiden University Libraries.
- 1566, Basel, by Henricus Petrus. A copy of this is held by the University of Sydney; previously owned by Owen Gingerich.
- 1617, Amsterdam, by Nicolaus Mulerius.
- 1854, Warsaw, with Polish translation and the authentic preface by Copernicus.
- 1873, Thorn; German translation sponsored by the local Coppernicus Society, with all of Copernicus' textual corrections given as footnotes.

== Latin texts available online ==
- 1543, Nuremberg, by Johannes Petreius; online from Harvard University.

== English texts available online ==
- Copernicus, Nicolaus (1543) De Revolutionibus Orbium Coelestium; online from Source Library.

== Translations ==
English translations of De revolutionibus have included:

- On the Revolutions of the Heavenly Spheres, translated by C. G. Wallis, Annapolis, St John's College Bookstore, 1939. Republished in volume 16 of the Great Books of the Western World, Chicago, Encyclopædia Britannica, 1952; in the series of the same name, published by the Franklin Library, Franklin Center, Philadelphia, 1985; in volume 15 of the second edition of the Great Books, Encyclopædia Britannica, 1990; and Amherst, NY: Prometheus Books, 1995, Great Minds Series – Science, ISBN 1-57392-035-5.
- On the Revolutions of the Heavenly Spheres, translated with an introduction and notes by A. M. Duncan, Newton Abbot, David & Charles, ISBN 0-7153-6927-X; New York: Barnes and Noble, 1976, ISBN 0-06-491279-5.
- On the Revolutions; translation and commentary by Edward Rosen, Baltimore: Johns Hopkins University Press, 1992, ISBN 0-8018-4515-7. (Foundations of Natural History. Originally published in Warsaw, Poland, 1978.)

== See also ==
- List of most expensive books and manuscripts
- Wittenberg interpretation of Copernicus
