= Commentariolus =

Work by Copernicus

De hypothesibus motuum coelestium a se constitutis commentariolus
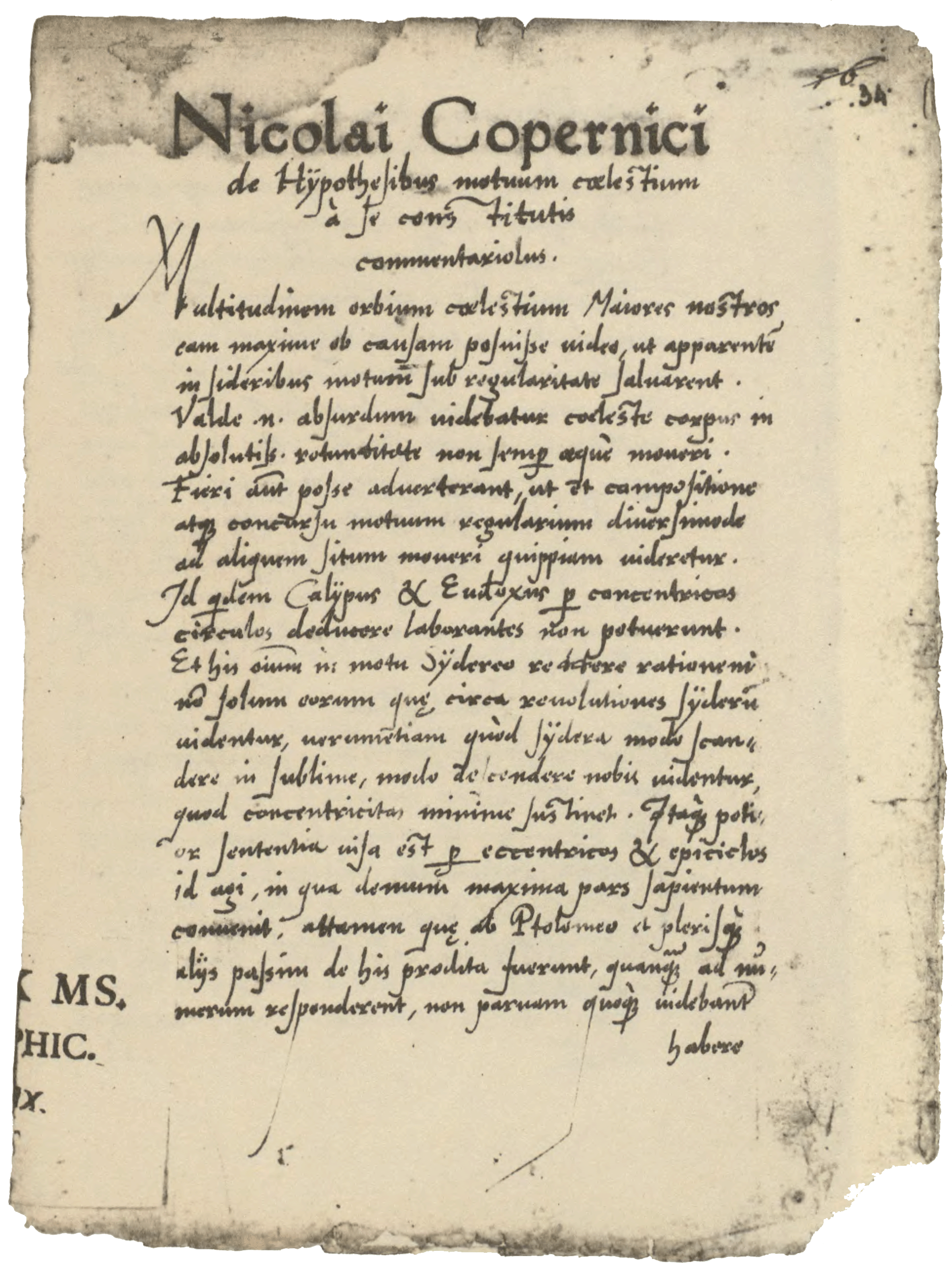
- Ms. Austrian National Library, 10530, f. 34r
- Author: Nicolaus Copernicus
- Language: Latin
- Subject: Astronomy
- Publication date: 1514

The Commentariolus (Little Commentary) is Nicolaus Copernicus's brief outline of an early version of his revolutionary heliocentric theory of the universe. After further long development of his theory, Copernicus published the mature version in 1530 in his landmark work, De revolutionibus orbium coelestium (On the Revolutions of the Heavenly Spheres).

Copernicus wrote the Commentariolus in Latin by 1514 and circulated copies to his friends and colleagues. (Note: A reference to the Commentariolus is contained in a library catalogue, dated 1 May 1514, of a 16th-century historian, Matthew of Miechow, so it must have begun circulating before that date.) It thus became known among Copernicus's contemporaries, though it was never printed during his lifetime. In 1533, Johann Albrecht Widmannstetter delivered a series of lectures in Rome outlining Copernicus' theory. Pope Clement VII and several Catholic cardinals heard the lectures and were interested in the theory. On 1 November 1536, Nikolaus von Schönberg, Archbishop of Capua and since the preceding year a cardinal, wrote to Copernicus from Rome and asked him for a copy of his writings "at the earliest possible moment".

Although copies of the Commentariolus circulated for a time after Copernicus's death, (Note: Tycho Brahe obtained a copy in 1575, and subsequently presented copies to students and colleagues as tokens of his esteem.) it subsequently lapsed into obscurity, and its previous existence remained known only indirectly, until a surviving manuscript copy was discovered and published in the second half of the nineteenth century. (Note: According to Rosen (2004, pp. 6–7), a manuscript copy of the Commentariolus was discovered in Vienna and published in 1878. It was said by Koyré (1973, p. 76) that a very poor copy was published in the 1854 Warsaw edition of De revolutionibus. This seems to be a mistake.)

== Summary ==
The Commentariolus is subdivided into eight sections (or chapters), of which all but the first bear brief descriptive titles. After a brief introduction, the first section states seven postulates from which Copernicus proposes to show that the apparent motion of the planets can be explained systematically.

=== The seven postulates ===
1. Celestial bodies do not all revolve around a single point.
2. The centre of the Earth is the centre of the lunar sphere—the orbit of the Moon around the Earth.
3. All the spheres rotate around the Sun, which is near the centre of the Universe.
4. The distance between the Earth and the Sun is an insignificant fraction of the distance from the Earth and the Sun to the stars.
5. The stars are immovable; their apparent daily motion is caused by the daily rotation of the Earth.
6. The Earth is moved in a sphere around the Sun, causing the apparent annual migration of the Sun; the Earth has more than one motion.
7. The Earth’s orbital motion around the Sun causes the seeming reverse in direction of the motions of the planets.

The remaining seven sections are titled, in order, De ordine orbium ("The order of the spheres"), De motibus qui circa solem apparent ("The apparent motions of the Sun"), Quod aequalitas motum non ad aequinoctia sed ad stellas fixas referatur ("Equal motion should be measured not by the equinoxes but by the fixed stars"), De Luna ("The Moon"), De tribus superioribus: Saturno, Jove et Marte ("The outer planets: Saturn, Jupiter and Mars"), De Venere ("Venus") and De Mercurio ("Mercury").

=== The order of the spheres ===
In this section, the heavenly spheres are given in order from outermost to innermost. The outermost sphere is that of the fixed stars, which remains perfectly stationary. Then follow those of Saturn, Jupiter, Mars, Earth, Venus and Mercury, which each revolve about the Sun from west to east with successively shorter periods of revolution, Saturn's being between 29 and 30 years, Jupiter's between 11 and 12, Mars's between 2 and 3, Earth's exactly one, Venus's between 8 and 9 months, (Note: Copernicus does not specify which type of month he is referring to. His period for Venus would be correct if he were referring to tropical or sidereal months. Venus's period is, however, less than 8 synodic months.) and Mercury's between 2 and 3 months. The Moon's sphere, however, revolves around the Earth in a period of one month, and moves with it around the Sun like an epicycle.

=== The apparent motion of the Sun ===
This section explains how the apparent motion of the Sun could arise from three separate motions of the Earth. The first motion is a uniform revolution, with a period of one year, from west to east along a circular orbit whose centre is offset from the Sun by 1/25 of the orbit's radius.

The second motion is the daily rotation about an axis which passes through the Earth's centre and is inclined at an angle of about 23 1/2° to the perpendicular to the plane of its orbit.

The third motion is a precession of the Earth's axis of rotation about an axis perpendicular to the plane of its orbit. Copernicus specified the rate of this precession with respect to the radial line from the Earth to the centre of its orbit as being slightly less than a year, with an implied direction as being from west to east. With respect to the fixed stars, this precession is very slow, and in the opposite direction—from east to west—and explains the phenomenon of the precession of the equinoxes.

=== Equal motion should be measured not by the equinoxes but by the fixed stars ===
Here Copernicus asserts that the motion of the equinoxes and celestial poles has not been uniform, and argues that consequently they should not be used to define the reference frame with respect to which the motions of the planets are measured, and that the periods of the various planetary motions are more accurately determinable if those motions are measured with respect to the fixed stars. He maintains that he had found the length of the sidereal year to have always been 365 days 6 hours and 10 minutes. (Note: A value that lies within one minute of what it is now.)

=== The Moon ===
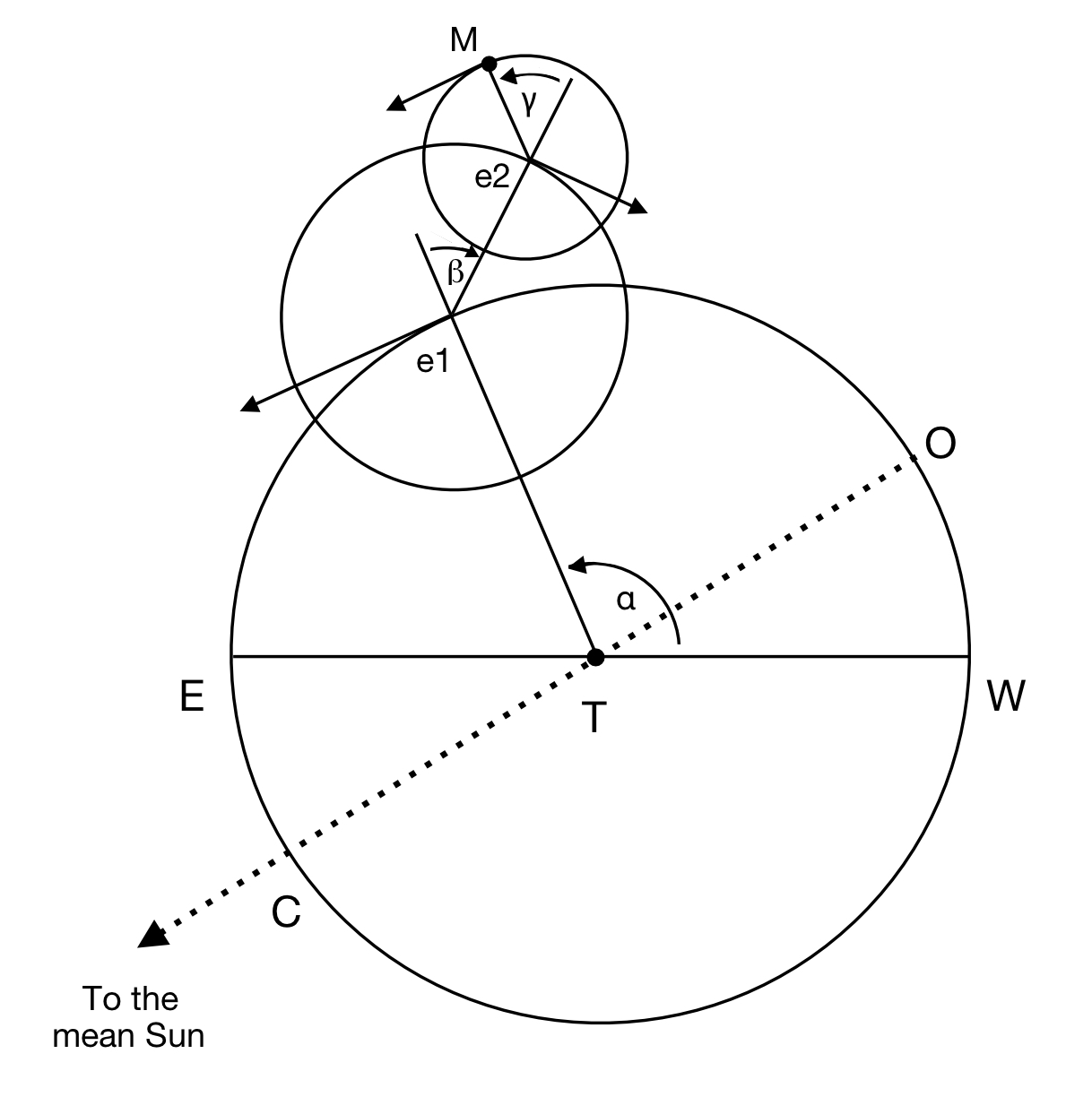
Diagram of the Moon's orbit, as described by Copernicus in his Commentariolus

Including the annual revolution around the Sun, which the Moon shares with the Earth in his system, Copernicus explains the Moon's motion as composed of five independent motions. Its motion around the Earth lies in a plane which is inclined at an angle of 5° to the plane of the Earth's orbit, and which precesses from east to west around an axis perpendicular to that plane, with a period of between 18 and 19 years with respect to the fixed stars. The remaining three motions, which take place within this orbital plane, are depicted in the diagram to the right. The first of these is that of the first, and larger, of two epicycles, whose center (represented by the point e1 in the diagram) moves uniformly from west to east around the circumference of a deferent centred on the Earth (represented by point T in the diagram), with a period of one draconitic month. (Note: The period referred to here is the time between two successive passages of the epicycle's centre through its ascending node (represented in the diagram by the point W), or two successive passages through its descending node (represented in the diagram by the point E). Copernicus does not always distinguish which periods and which types of month he is referring to, but these can be inferred from our knowledge of the actual motion of the Moon.) The centre of the second, smaller epicycle (represented by the point e2 in the diagram) moves uniformly from east to west around the circumference of the first so that the period of the angle β in the diagram is one anomalistic month.

The Moon itself, represented by the point M in the diagram, moves uniformly from west to east around the circumference of the second epicycle so that the period of the angle γ is half a synodic month. Copernicus states that whenever the point e1 lies on the line joining the Earth to the centre of its orbit (represented by the dotted line OTC in the diagram, of which only the point T here lies in the Moon's orbital plane), the Moon M will lie precisely between e1 and e2. However, this can occur only once every 19 years, when this line coincides with the line of nodes WTE. At other times it does not lie in the moon's orbital plane and the point e1 cannot therefore pass through it. In general, then, while the Moon will be close to conjunction or opposition to the Sun whenever it lies precisely between e1 and e2, these events will not be precisely simultaneous.

The ratio which Copernicus took as that for the relative lengths of the small epicycle, large epicycle and deferent is 4:19:180.

=== The outer planets, Saturn, Jupiter and Mars ===
The theories Copernicus gives in the Commentariolus for the motions of the outer planets all have the same general structure, and only differ in the values of the various parameters needed to specify their motions completely. Their orbits are not coplanar with that of the Earth, but do share its centre as their own common centre, and lie in planes that are only slightly inclined to the Earth's orbital plane. Unlike the Moon's orbital plane, those of the superior planets do not precess. Their inclinations to the Earth's orbital plane do oscillate, however, between the limits 0°10′ and 1°50′ for Mars, 1°15′ and 1°40′ for Jupiter, and 2°15′ and 2°40′ for Saturn. Although Copernicus supposes these oscillations to take place around the orbits' lines of nodes that he assumes to remain fixed, the mechanism he uses to model them does cause tiny oscillations in the lines of nodes as well. As Kepler later pointed out, the necessity for assuming oscillations in the inclinations of the outer planets' orbital planes is an artefact of Copernicus's having taken them as passing through the centre of the Earth's orbit. If he had taken them as passing through the Sun, he would not have needed to introduce these oscillations.

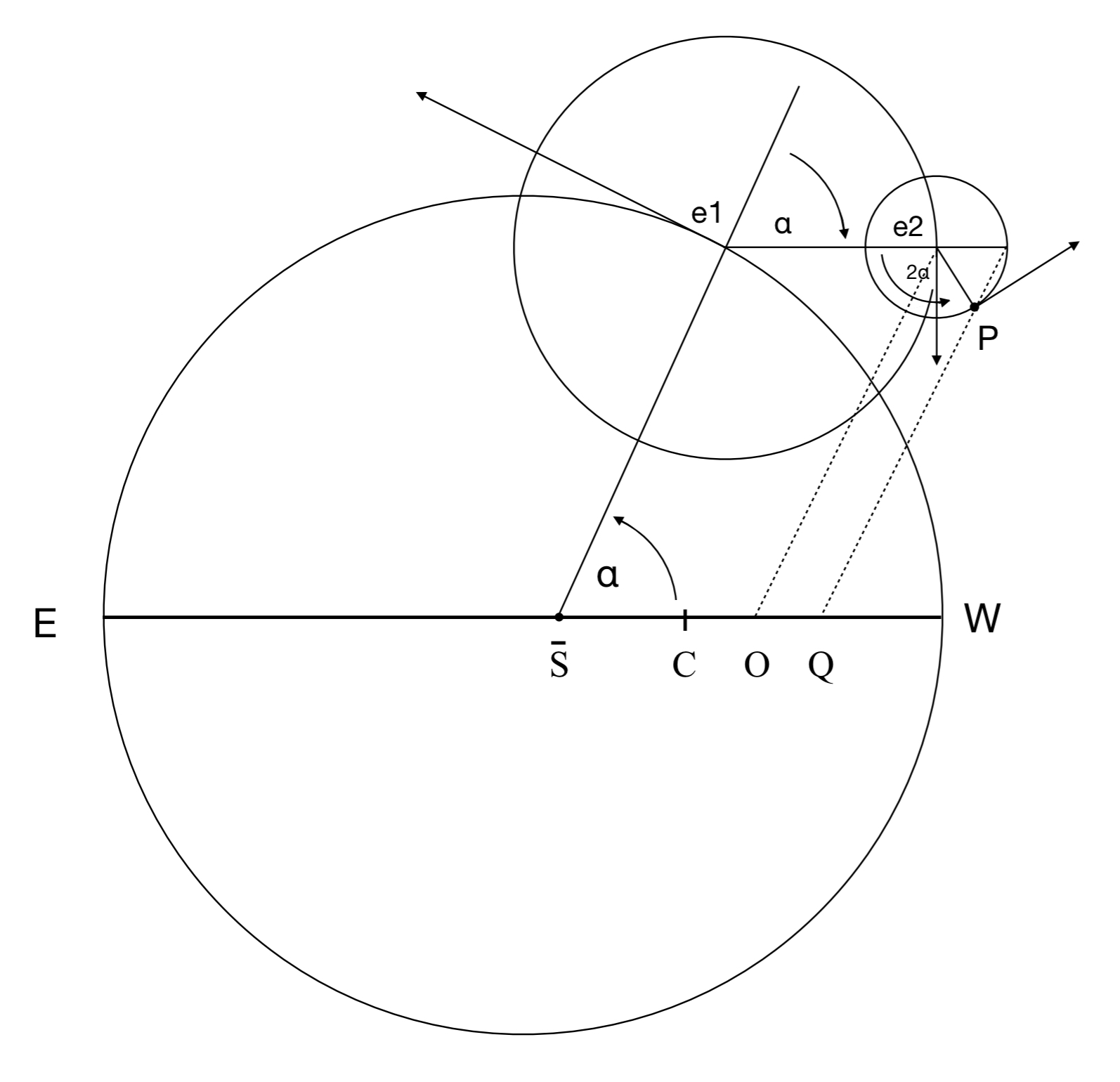
Diagram of an outer planet's orbit, as described by Copernicus in his Commentariolus

Like the Moon's motion, that of the outer planets, represented in the diagram to the right, is produced by a combination of a deferent and two epicycles. The centre of the first, and larger of the two epicycles, represented by the point e1 in the diagram, revolves uniformly from west to east around the circumference of a deferent whose centre is the centre of the Earth's orbit, represented by the point S̅ in the diagram, with a period relative to the fixed stars as given in the section The order of the spheres above.

The centre of the second epicycle, represented by the point e2 in the diagram, revolves uniformly from east to west around the circumference of the first, with the same period relative to the radial line joining S̅ to e1. As a consequence, the direction of the radial line joining e1 to e2 remains fixed relative to the fixed stars, parallel to the planet's line of apses EW, and the point e2 describes an eccentric circle (Note: That is, a circle whose centre is offset from what would be regarded as the natural centre of the planet's orbit—in this case, the centre of the Earth's orbit.) whose radius is equal to that of the deferent, and whose centre, represented by the point O in the diagram, is offset from that of the deferent by the radius of the first epicycle. In his later work, De revolutionibus orbium coelestium, Copernicus uses this eccentric circle directly, rather than representing it as a combination of a deferent and an epicycle.

The planet itself, represented by the point P in the diagram, revolves uniformly from west to east around the circumference of the second epicycle, whose radius is exactly one third of that of the first, at twice the rate of revolution of e1 about S̅. This device enabled Copernicus to dispense with the equant, a much-criticised feature of Claudius Ptolemy's theories for the motions of the outer planets. In a heliocentric version of Ptolemy's models, his equant would lie at the point Q in the diagram, offset along the line of apses EW from the point S̅ by a distance one and a third times the radius of Copernicus's first epicycle. The centre of the planet's deferent, with the same radius as Copernicus's, would lie at the point C, mid-way between S̅ and Q. The planet itself would lie at the point of intersection of this deferent with the line QP. While this point only coincides exactly with P whenever they are both at an apsis, (Note: At all other times it will lie strictly between Q and P.) the difference between their positions is always negligible in comparison with the inaccuracies inherent to both theories.

For the ratios of the radii of the outer planets' deferents to radius of the Earth, the Commentariolus gives 1 13/25 for Mars, 5 13/60 for Jupiter, and 9 7/30 for Saturn. For the ratios of the radii of their deferents to the radii of the larger of their epicycles, it gives 6 138/167 for Mars, 12 553/606 for Jupiter, and 11 859/1181 for Saturn. (Note: Copernicus does not give these ratios directly, but expresses the radii of the planets' deferents and epicycles in terms of a unit of length which is 1/25th of the radius of the Earth's orbit.)

=== Venus ===
In the last two sections Copernicus talks about Venus and Mercury. The first has a system of circles and takes 9 months to complete a revolution.

=== Mercury ===
Mercury's orbit is harder than any of the other planets' to study because it is visible for only a few days a year. Mercury, just like Venus, has two epicycles, one greater than another. It takes almost three months to complete a revolution.
