= Cornelius Gemma =

Flemish astronomer and astrologer (1535–1578)

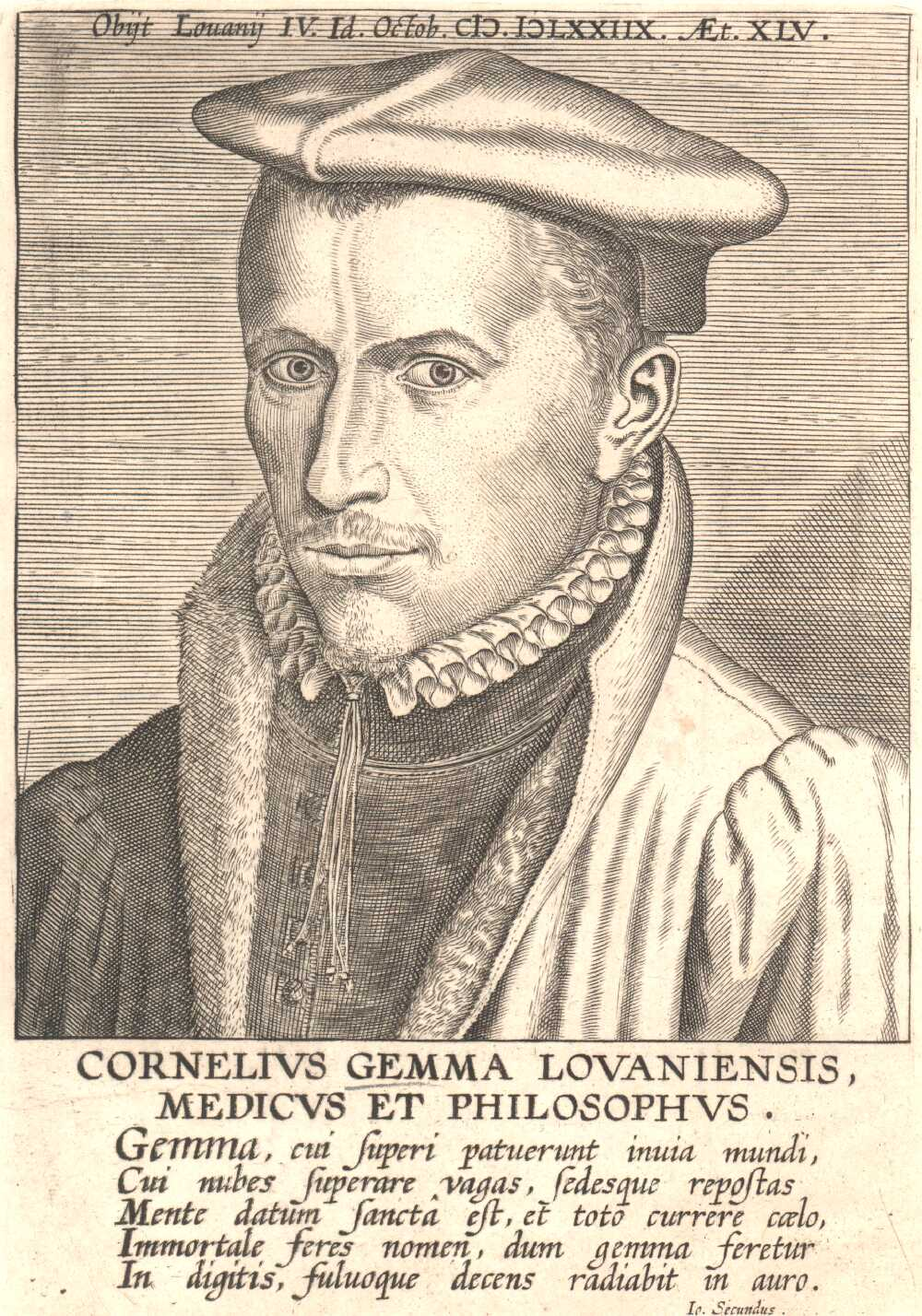
Cornelius Gemma of Leuven, identified as medicus et philosophus, "physician and philosopher"

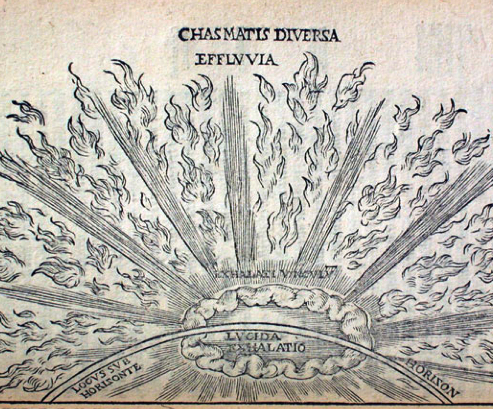
Illustration of an aurora by Cornelius Gemma, the first to be published for scientific purposes, from his 1575 book on the 1572 supernova

Cornelius (or Cornelio) Gemma (28 February 1535 – 12 October 1578) (Note: In his Latin biography, Melchior Adam says that Gemma died on 12 October 1579, at the age of 45; modern scholars, however, almost uniformly cite 1578 as the year of his death.) was a Flemish physician, astronomer and astrologer, and the oldest son of cartographer and instrument-maker Gemma Frisius. He was a professor of medicine at the Catholic University of Leuven, and shared in his father's efforts to restore ancient Ptolemaic practice to astrology, drawing on the Tetrabiblos.

As an astronomer, Gemma is significant for his observations of a lunar eclipse in 1569 and of the 1572 supernova appearing in Cassiopeia, which he recorded on 9 November, two days before Tycho Brahe, calling it a "New Venus." With Brahe, he was one of the few astronomers to identify the Great Comet of 1577 as superlunary. Gemma is also credited with publishing the first scientific illustration of the aurora, in his 1575 book on the supernova.

Another milestone appears in his medical writings: in 1552, Gemma published the first illustration of a human tapeworm.

Gemma's two major works, De arte cyclognomica (Antwerp, 1569) and De naturae divinis characterismis (Antwerp, 1575), have been called "true 'hidden gems' in early modern intellectual history," bringing together such topics as medicine, astronomy, astrology, teratology, divination, eschatology, and encyclopaedism.

Gemma also has the distinction of being called "the first true orchid hobbyist, in the modern sense."

== Life ==
Cornelius Gemma was born on 28 February 1535 in Leuven, but attended the Latin school at Mechelen. He began studying with the arts faculty in Leuven at the age of 14, and continued at the medical faculty. In 1569, he succeeded professor Nicolas Biesius and obtained a doctorate in 1570.

Gemma died in Leuven around 1578, during an epidemic of the plague to which a third of the city's population had also succumbed. Although he had already proven to be a prolific writer, he was only in his mid-forties. His epitaph consists of two elegiac couplets in Latin, punning on lapis ("stone, precious stone, tombstone") and Gemma ("precious stone, gem"). He was survived by two sons: Raphael, who entered the priesthood, and Philip, who followed family tradition as a medical doctor.

== Works ==
Gemma edited his father's posthumous work De astrolabo catholica (Antwerpen, 1556). In 1560, he began publishing his own work in the annual series Ephemerides meteorologicae, printed by Joannes Withagen. The Ephemerides is the earliest known astrological work from the Low Countries to carry an official notice of approval from the Roman Catholic Church. Gemma moved away from judicial astrology and renounced astrological predictions about political events, and seems to have gradually confined himself to predictions about astronomical phenomena and meteorological astrology. His predictions for 1561, for example, provided detailed information on every lunar phase, and most planetary aspects and phases of fixed stars in relation to the sun, with a thoroughness that surpassed the predictions of his contemporaries. He remained committed to astrologic medicine, however, and believed that predictable atmospheric conditions, extending to astral conjunctions, generated disease.

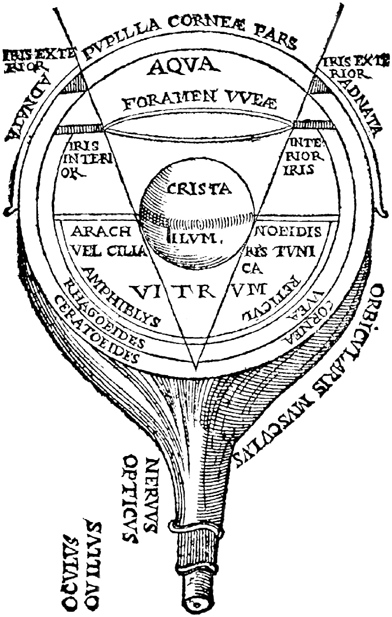
One of the many illustrations by Cornelius Gemma from De arte cyclognomica (vol. 3), showing the eye with its hollow optic nerve

Gemma attempted to formulate a universal philosophy that brought together inferiors and celestials, nature, soul and intellect, numbers, ideas and external objects. In the three volumes De arte cyclognomica, he synthesized the teachings of Hippocrates, Plato, Galen, and Aristotle by a method perhaps derived from Lullius. This "cyclognomic art" is an arrangement of seven concentric circles, starting from the outermost:

  - substances;
  - accidents;
  - absolute predicates;
  - relatives;
  - virtues;
  - vices;
  - questions.

A profusion of charts, celestial diagrams, and spherical triangles is characteristic of Gemma's ars cyclognomica, as is the use of three as a mystic number. Disciplines are grouped under three faculties or spheres:

  - imaginatio (physics, astronomy, medicine and related fields);
  - ratio (grammar, rhetoric, cyclognomic, dialectic);
  - intellectus (metaphysics subdivided into mathematics, ethics, and theology).

Gemma's two volumes De naturae divinis characterismis (1575), on divine marks or features in nature, included tales of medical marvels. An example may be found online in the Compendium Maleficiarum of Francesco Maria Guazzo: a 15-year-old girl was reported to excrete a live eel and to vomit a prodigious stream of hairs, skin fragments, stones and bones. Although the cause was thought to be demonic, Gemma is said to have approached treatment with "natural causes." Guazzo also says that Gemma discussed spontaneous sex change in humans.

Gemma viewed the relation of prodigies and cosmology in light of his medical practice; that is, just as a physician could interpret a patient's symptoms to predict disease, a reading of prodigies in nature could provide insight into divine intention in the universe. He regarded this ars cosmocritica as a new science.

=== The Great Comet of 1577 ===
One of Gemma's more scientifically significant works dealt with the Great Comet of 1577, which he first observed on 14 November of that year. Gemma was one of the few astronomers — most famously Tycho Brahe, but also Helisaeus Roeslin, William IV, Landgrave of Hesse-Kassel and Michael Mästlin — who identified the comet as superlunary. Brahe was highly critical of his colleague's mathematical deficiencies, but praised his section on macrocosmic portents and on the comet's physical characteristics. Gemma subordinated his accurate astronomical observations to a moral purpose; "to Gemma," writes Tabitta van Nouhuys, "the investigation of the comet's mathematical and physical characteristics was not an end in itself, but a means of gaining an insight into the arrangement of the cosmos and the divinely inspired sympathies between its parts."

== Bibliography ==
- Thorndike, Lynn. History of Magic and Experimental Science, unknown edition. On Cornelius Gemma, pp. 406–408, limited preview online.
- Vanden Broecke, Steven. The Limits of Influence: Pico, Louvain, and the Crisis of Renaissance Astrology. Brill, 2003. On Cornelius Gemma, pp. 186–190, limited preview online.
- van Nouhuys, Tabitta. The Age of Two-faced Janus: The Comets of 1577 and 1618 and the Decline of the Aristotelian World View in the Netherlands. Brill, 1998. Extensive discussion of Gemma's views on comets, pp. 169–189 online.
- Hiro Hirai, "Cornelius Gemma and His Neoplatonic Reading of Hippocrates," in: Hiro Hirai, Medical Humanism and Natural Philosophy: Renaissance Debates on Matter, Life and the Soul (Boston-Leiden: Brill, 2011), 104–122.
