= Adam Haslmayr =

German writer

Adam Haslmayr (31 October 1562 – 16 January 1630) was a German writer, who was the first commentator of the Rosicrucian Manifestos. He called the revelation of Paracelsus the "Theophrastia Sancta".

== Life ==
Adam Haslmayr was born in Bozen, South Tyrol, and worked as a public notary in South Tyrol. In 1592 he published in Augsburg the Newe Teutsche Gesang, a printed collection of polyphonic songs in German. In 1612 he stated that he saw a manuscript of Fama Fraternitatis in 1610, although the text was first published in 1614. His statement, published in his Answer to the Praiseworthy Brotherhood of Theosophers of Rozenkreuz was included in the same volume as the Fama Fraternitatis, but the original edition is still kept at the Anna-Amalia Library, Germany. Haslmayr was a close friend of Karl Widemann, with whom he had shared a house, and Benedictus Figulus, both also closely related to the early Rosicrucian furore. Figulus had brought Haslmayr into contact with Widemann, who in turn introduced him to prince August of Anhalt.

Haslmayr's Answer was published in 1612 with the financial aid of August of Anhalt. Shortly after, Haslmayr was sent to work at the galleys in Genoa by Maximilian III of Austria, and was released only 4–5 years later. He died in Augsburg.
