= Great Comet of 1577 =

Non-periodic comet

C/1577 V1 (Tycho) (Great Comet of 1577)
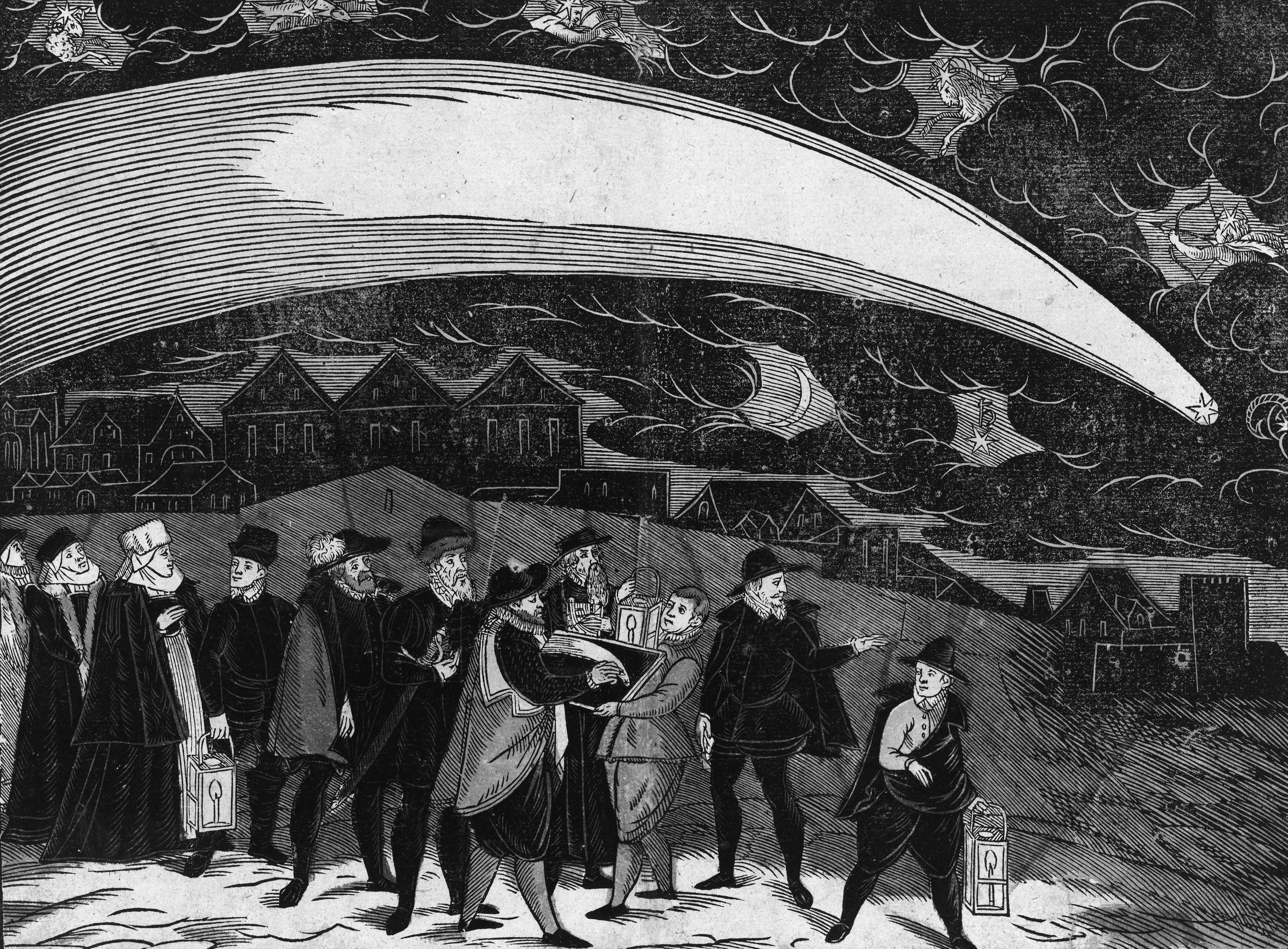
- The Great Comet of 1577, seen over Prague on 12 November. Engraving made by Jiri Daschitzky.

Discovery
- Discovery site: Peru
- Discovery date: 1 November 1577

Designations
- Alternative designations: Tycho's Comet

Orbital characteristics
- Observation arc: 74 days
- Number of observations: 24
- Perihelion: 0.1775 AU
- Eccentricity: 1.0 (assumed)
- Inclination: 104.883°
- Longitude of ascending node: 31.237°
- Argument of periapsis: 255.673°
- Last perihelion: 27 October 1577

Physical characteristics
- Comet total magnitude (M1): –1.8
- Apparent magnitude: –3.0 (1577 apparition)

The Great Comet of 1577 (designated as C/1577 V1 in modern nomenclature) is a non-periodic comet that passed close to Earth with first observation being possible in Peru on 1 November 1577. Final observation was made on 26 January 1578.

Tycho Brahe was one of the most distinguished observers of this comet, making thousands of precise measurements about it. The observations made by Brahe led him to believe the comet was outside of the orbit of the sun and moon. There were many independent observers of the comet from across the world. Many had different explanations for the comet. Some, such as Sultan Murad III, saw the comet as an evil omen. Others took a scientific approach, like Michael Mästlin who used the comet to fill gaps in Copernicus's model of the universe. It inspired artists, like Jiri Dschitzky, who made an engraving of the comet as it passed over Prague. Currently, using JPL Horizons, it is believed that the comet is ~324 AU (48.5 billion km) from the sun.

== Observations by Tycho Brahe ==
Tycho Brahe, who is said to have first viewed the comet slightly before sunset on 13 November after having returned from a day of fishing, was the most distinguished observer and documenter of the comet's passing.

Sketches found in one of Brahe's notebooks seem to indicate that the comet travelled close to Venus. These sketches depict the Earth at the centre of the Solar System, with the Sun and moon in orbit and the other planets revolving around the Sun, a model that was later displaced by heliocentricity. Brahe made thousands of very precise measurements of the comet's path, and these findings contributed to Johannes Kepler's theorizing of the laws of planetary motion and the realization that the planets moved in elliptical orbits. Brahe made these measurements using a 16 inch radius quadrant, which he used to measure the altitude and azimuth of the comet. In order to compare the comet to known stationary celestial objects, Brahe used a simple sextant which was simply a graduated sixth of a circle. Kepler, who was Brahe's assistant during his time in Prague, believed that the comet's behavior and existence was proof enough to displace the theory of celestial spheres, although this view turned out to be overly optimistic about the pace of change.

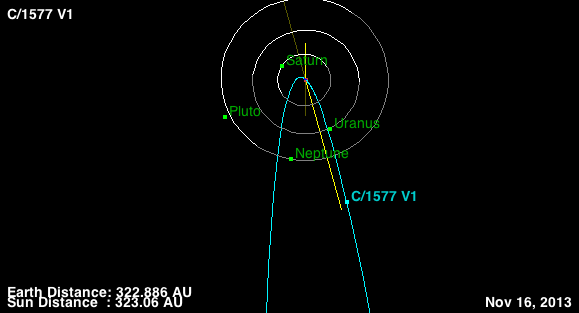
In 2013, the distance between the Sun and comet C/1577 V1 was about 320 AU.

Brahe's discovery that the comet's coma faced away from the Sun was also significant.

One failing of Brahe's measurements was in exactly how far out of the atmosphere the comet was, and he was unable to supply meaningful and correct figures for this distance; however, he was, at least, successful in proving that the comet was beyond the orbit of the Moon about the Earth, and, further to this, was probably near three times further away. He did this by comparing the position of the comet in the night sky where he observed it (the island Hven, near Copenhagen) with the position observed by Thadaeus Hagecius (Tadeáš Hájek) in Prague at the same time, giving deliberate consideration to the movement of the Moon. It was discovered that, while the comet was in approximately the same place for both of them, the Moon was not, and this meant that the comet was much further out.

Brahe's finding that comets were heavenly objects, while widely accepted, was the cause of debate up until and during the seventeenth century, with many theories circulating within the astronomical community. Galileo claimed that comets were optical phenomena, and that this made their parallaxes impossible to measure. However, his hypothesis was not widely accepted.

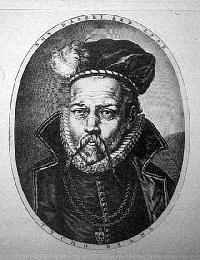
Tycho Brahe

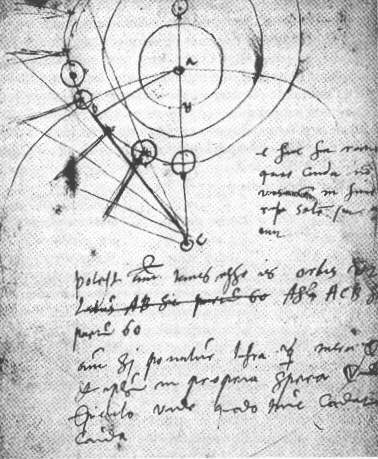
Observations by Brahe of the Great Comet of 1577

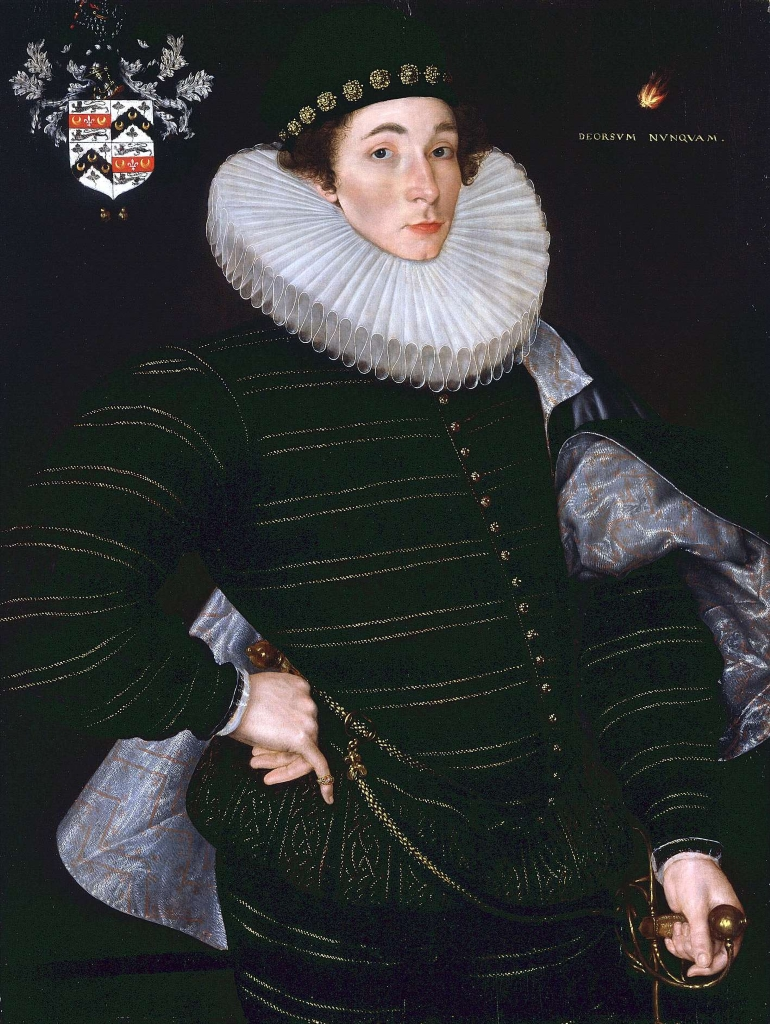
Richard Goodricke, by Cornelis Ketel c.1578, with comet top right.

== Observations around the World ==
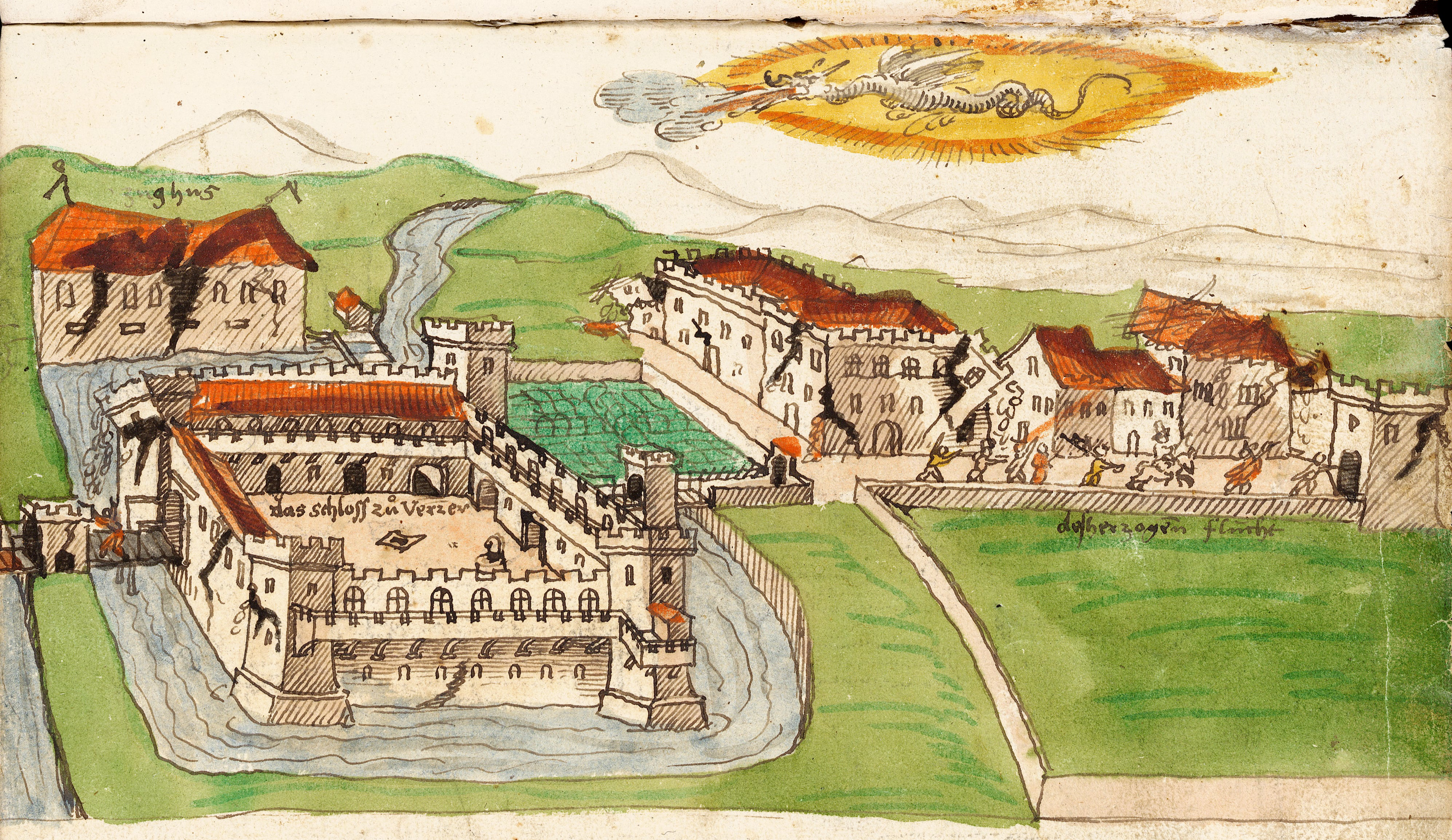
The city of Ferrara and the Great Comet of 1577. Ferrara's economy collapsed due to the 1570 earthquake

Using all the records to estimate the orbit, it seems that the perihelion was on 27 October. The first recorded observation is from Peru on November 1: the accounts noted that it was seen through the clouds like the Moon. It is recorded in the Codex Aubin as appearing on Wednesday 6 November 1577 as a “smoking star” in the Nahuatl-language text of folio 60v. On 7 November, in Ferrara, Italy, architect Pirro Ligorio described "the comet shimmering from a burning fire inside the dazzling cloud." On 8 November, it was reported by Japanese astronomers with a Moon-like brightness and a white tail spanning over 60 degrees.

Several other observers recorded seeing the comet: The astronomer Taqi al-Din Muhammad ibn Ma'ruf recorded the passage of the comet. The Sultan Murad III saw these observations as a bad omen for the war and blamed al-Din for the plague which spread at the time. Other observers include Helisaeus Roeslin, William IV, Landgrave of Hesse-Kassel, Cornelius Gemma, who noted the comet had two tails and Michael Mästlin also identified it as superlunary. This comet and the observation that it was traveling on the earth’s atmosphere was also what helped Maestlin to explain the gaps in Copernicus’s planetary system. According to Maestlin, a comet would carry its own orb, since he considered comets to be part of the heavenly objects. These orbs, he suggested, are what fill the gaps in Copernicus’s system.

Additionally it was independently observed by Indian observers Abu'l-Fazl ibn Mubarak and Ārif Qandahārī recorded the comet's passing and believed the comet influenced assassination of Shah Ismail of Persia, son of Shah Tahmasp on 26 November 1577. Abu'l-Fazl ibn Mubarak recorded the comet's passage in his Akbarnama, noting that the comet had a long tail and was visible for 5 months. Ārif Qandahārī treated the comet as a brilliant sight and assigned no explicit evil. In his account of Tārikh-i Akbar Shāhī. Described the comet as a bright star with many small fragments appearing like a Cyprus tree, becoming known as the long tailed star.

As a young boy, Johannes Kepler was taken by his mother to see the comet.

== In art and literature ==
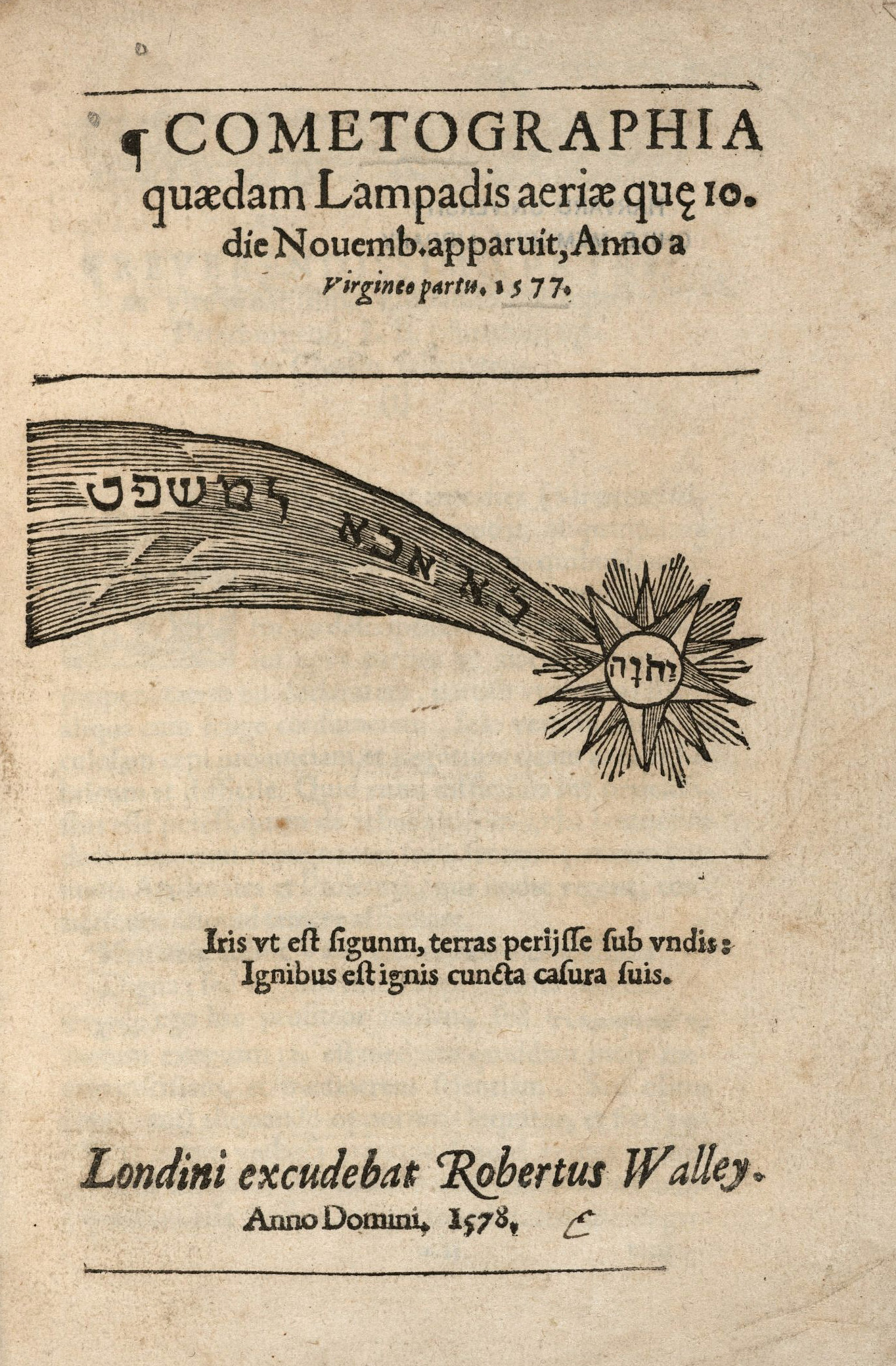
Cometographia, a book on the Great Comet of 1577, by Laurence Johnson

The literature resulting from the passing of the comet was prolific, and these works, as well as the ideas presented by many astronomers, caused much controversy. However, the idea that comets were heavenly objects became a respected theory, and many took this concept to be true. Artwork inspired by the event was also made—artist Jiri Daschitzky made an engraving that was inspired by the passing of the comet over Prague on 12 November 1577. Cornelis Ketel painted the portrait of Richard Goodricke around 1578. Goodricke had reached adulthood in 1577 and apparently saw the comet as an omen and had it included in the painting. Roeslin also produced one of the more complex of the representations of the Great Comet, described as "an interesting, though crude, attempt". In Chaim Vital's book The Book of Visions, which is a book describing the meaning behind different dreams and omens, Vital simply describes the comet and offers no explanation as to what it could mean. At the time there were also numerous comet tracts made of the comet as it went across the sky. These were made by Tycho Brahe and numerous other astronomers at the time. There were also numerous prints in early newspapers called broadsides. These broadsides shared news about this comet to the general populace.

== Contemporary references ==
The comet was mentioned in the 17th century Vietnamese chronicle Đại Việt sử ký toàn thư, Book 17, part 1:

"In November 1577 (lunar calendar), comet appears, pointing at the southeastern sky, its luminous tail is as long as 40 zhàng with rose and purple tint, everyone was frightened. On first date of December, the comet disappears".

Due to this observation, King Lê Thế Tông changed his era name to Quang Hưng (光興) meaning bright and rising in the next year, 1578.

The comet was also recorded by Chinese historians in History of Ming, Book 27, Treatises, Astronomy part 3.

This comet was mentioned in the book entitled Sêfer Chazionot – The Book Of Visions by Rabbi Hayyim ben Joseph Vital:

"1577. Rosh Hodesh Kislev (November 11), after sunrise, a large star with a long tail, pointing upward, was seen in the southwestern part of the sky. Part of the tail was also pointing eastward. It lingered there for three hours. Then it sank in the west behind the hills of Safed. This continued for more than fifty nights. On the fifteenth of Kislev, I went to live in Jerusalem".

In Ireland, the Great Comet was observed, and an account of its passing was later inserted in the Annals of the Four Masters:

"A wonderful star appeared in the south-east in the first month of winter: it had a curved bow-like tail, resembling bright lightning, the brilliancy of which illuminated the earth around, and the firmament above. This star was seen in every part of the west of Europe, and it was wondered at by all universally."

Henry Howard, Earl of Northampton, in his polemic A defensative against the poyson of supposed prophesies (1583, [sig. V iv]) described as an eyewitness the way Elizabeth I responded to the comet:

"How many Comets have been seen within these five and twenty years, before and after which, her majesty hath ever increased, rather than appayred [adversely affected] the sound state of her body? I can affirm thus much, as a present witness by mine own experience· that when divers upon greater scrupulosity then cause, went about to dissuade her majesty (lying then at Richmond) from looking on the Comet which appeared last: with a courage answerable to the greatness of her state, she caused the window to be set open, and cast out this word [motto, quotation] Iacta est alia the dice are thrown, affirming that her steadfast hope and confidence was too firmly planted in the providence of God, to be blasted or affrighted with those beams, which either had a ground in nature whereupon to rise, or at least no warrant out of scripture, to portend the mishaps of Princes. Behold a woman and a Queen, which seem to be the kinds and callings, upon which the Comets (if Astrologers speak truth) are wont to prey: and yet not only she relenteth not to common fear, but insulteth rather upon common folly. That the Comets hinder not the lives of Princes, I have proved heretofore at large, and shall have opportunity likewise to confirm hereafter, but thus much I dare affirm, that albeit the malice of the same were no less to be feared then some think: yet her contented mind, her harmless thoughts, her temperance in diet, abstinence from excess of all things that offend, with moderation of exercise, were enough to verify that proverb which hath been rife of old, Sapiens domabitur astris [‘the wise subdue the stars’]."

Queen Elizabeth's audacity in demonstratively placing her trust in God's protection, rather than fearing the comet as a bad omen to princes such as her, was a significant rejection of comets as heavenly signs of misfortune to follow. The anecdote was cited in an anonymous pamphlet prompted by the Great Comet of 1680, The Petitioning-comet, or, A Brief chronology of all the famous comets and their events that have happen'd from the birth of Christ, to this very day : together with a modest enquiry into this present comet.
