= Karl Widemann =

German author, physician and collector of manuscripts

Carl Widemann or Karl Widemann or Carolus Widemann, was a German author, physician and collector of manuscripts, from Augsburg, and briefly a secretary of the English alchemist Edward Kelley, at the court of Emperor Rudolf II.

== Life ==
Between 1587 and 1588, Widemann worked in Prague for Edward Kelley at the court of Emperor Rudolph II. Widemann also worked in Třeboň for the Rožmberks, also known as the Rosenberg family. Karl Widemann is known for copying and collecting over 30 years the works from Paracelsus. Because of this many unpublished works from Paracelsus survived to the present day. He did the same for the works of Caspar Schwenckfeld, and Widemann's close colleagues Valentin Krautwald and Adam Reusner. After Helisaeus Roeslin's (Helisäus Röslin) death in 1616, his unpublished astrology, theology and kabbalistic work merged into the manuscript collection of Karl Widemann. Adam Haslmayr a close friend of Widemann, wrote him a letter about Rosicrucian people who revealed the Theophrastiam, on December 24, 1611.

== Voynich manuscript ==
In March 1599 Emperor Rudolf II bought several "remarkable/rare books" from Carl Widemann for 500 Taler. As he was paid in 600 florin, these books might be identical with the book transaction of 600 ducats mentioned in the Marci letter and might have contained the Voynich manuscript.

== Works ==
- Interpraetatio Mystica et Vera in Quartum librum Esdrae Prophetae - 1619
- Paracelsi Testamentum
