= Paracelsianism =

Early modern medical movement

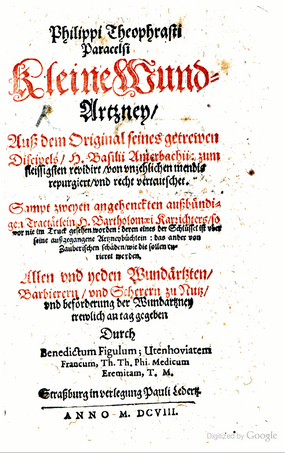
Title page of Benedictus Figulus's 1608 edition of Kleine Wund-Artzney, based on lecture notes by Basilius Amerbach the Elder (1488–1535) of lectures held by Paracelsus during his stay in Basel (1527).

Paracelsianism (also Paracelsism; German: Paracelsismus) was an early modern medical movement based on the theories and therapies of Paracelsus. It developed in the second half of the 16th century, during the decades following Paracelsus's death in 1541, and it flourished during the first half of the 17th century, representing one of the most comprehensive alternatives to learned medicine, the traditional system of therapeutics derived from Galenic physiology.

Based on the by then antiquated principle of maintaining harmony between the microcosm and macrocosm, Paracelsianism fell rapidly into decline in the later 17th century with the rise of the scientific movement, but left its mark on medical practices. It was responsible for the widespread introduction of mineral therapies and several other iatrochemical techniques.

Most well known Paracelsians were men but some educated women engaged in paracelsian alchemy in both its spiritual-philosophical and medicinal aspects.

== Spagyric ==
Spagyric, or spagyria, is a method developed by Paracelsus and his followers which was thought to improve the efficacy of existing medicines by separating them into their primordial elements (the tria prima: sulphur, mercury, and salt) and then again recombining them. Paracelsian physicians held that through this method the medically beneficial ingredients of a compound (the purified tria prima) were separated from the harmful and toxic ones, turning even some poisons into medicines.

This procedure involved fermentation, distillation, and extraction of mineral components from the ash of the plant. These processes were in use in medieval alchemy generally for the separation and purification of metals from ores (see Calcination), and salts from brines and other aqueous solutions.

=== Etymology ===
Originally coined by Paracelsus, the word comes from the Ancient Greek σπάω spao ('to separate, to draw out') and ἀγείρω ageiro ('to combine', 'to recombine', 'to gather'). In its original use, the word spagyric was commonly used synonymously with the word alchemy, however, in more recent times it has often been adopted by alternative medicine theorists and various techniques of holistic medicine.

== See also ==
- Sulfur-mercury theory of metals
