= The dose makes the poison =

Toxicology adage

"The dose makes the poison" (Latin: dosis sola facit venenum 'only the dose makes the poison') is a proverb intended to indicate a basic principle of toxicology. It is credited to Swiss physician Paracelsus who expressed the following classic toxicology maxim:

Alle Dinge sind Gift, und nichts ist ohne Gift; allein die Dosis macht, dass ein Ding kein Gift ist.
All things are poison, and nothing is without poison; the dosage alone makes it, so a thing is not a poison.

— Paracelsus, 1538

This is often condensed to: "The dose makes the poison" or in Latin, "Sola dosis facit venenum". It means that a substance can produce the harmful effect associated with its toxic properties only if it reaches a susceptible biological system within the body in a high enough concentration (i.e., dose).

The principle relies on the finding that all chemicals—even water and oxygen—can be toxic if too much is eaten, drunk, or absorbed. "The toxicity of any particular chemical depends on many factors, including the extent to which it enters an individual’s body." This finding also provides the basis for public health standards, which specify maximum acceptable concentrations of various contaminants in food, public drinking water, and the environment.

The idea also describes the phenomenon in which a poisonous substance, such as digitalis, can be medicinal (digoxin) in small, controlled, doses.

== See also ==
- Dose concentration – Ratio of part of a mixture to the whole
- Forensic toxicology – Use of toxicology for investigations
- Homeopathy – Pseudoscientific system of alternative medicine
- Hormesis – Characteristic of biological processes
- Median lethal dose – Measurement of lethal dose of substance
- Therapeutic index – Quantitative measurement of the relative safety of a drug
