= Beratzhausen =

- Municipality
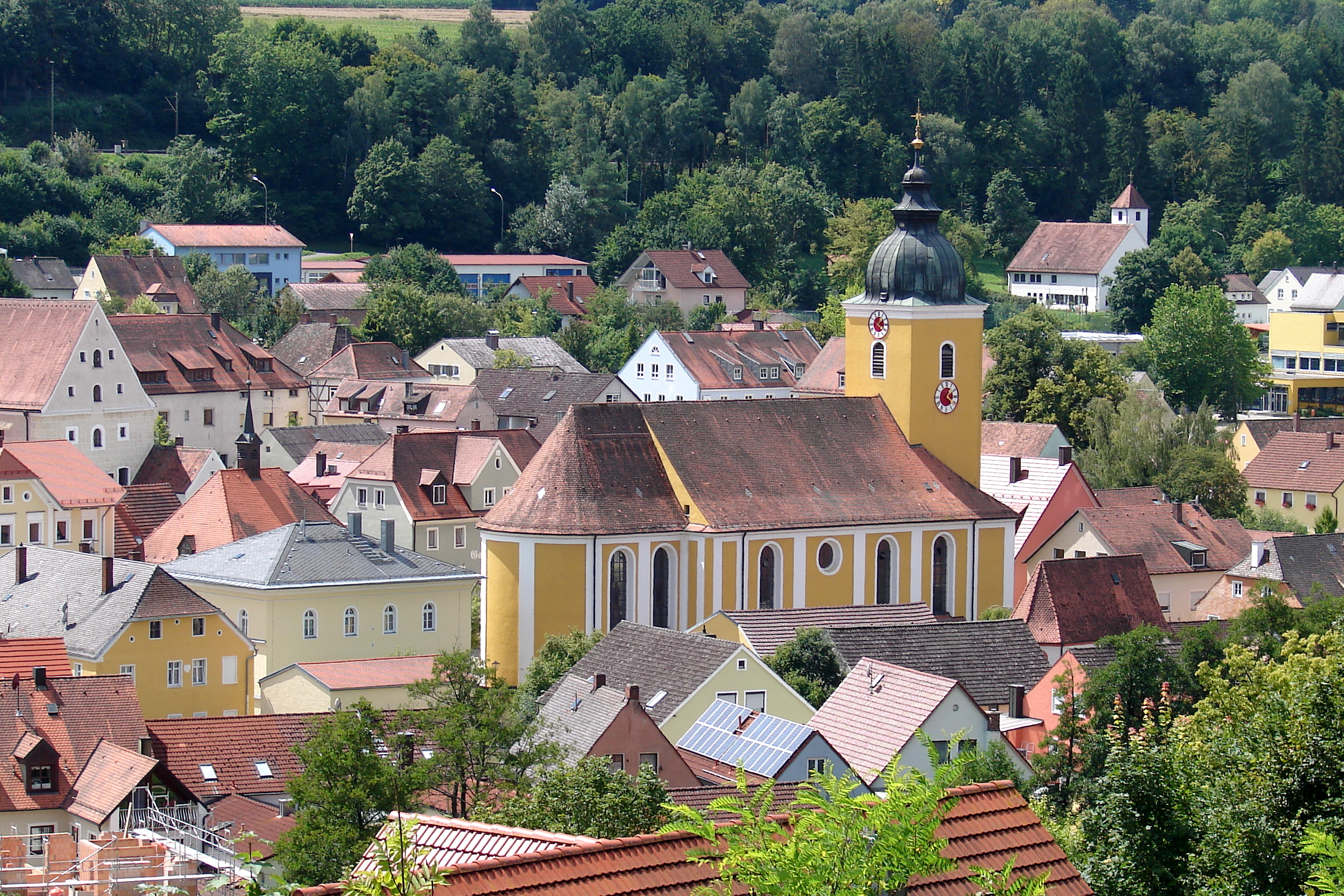
- Beratzhausen with the Church of Saints Peter and Paul

- Coat of arms

- Location of Beratzhausen within Regensburg district
- Interactive map of Beratzhausen
- Location within Germany Location within Bavaria
- Coordinates: 49°05′43″N 11°48′37″E
- Country: Germany
- State: Bavaria
- Admin. region: Oberpfalz
- District: Regensburg
- Subdivisions: 56 Ortsteile

Government
  - Mayor (2020–26): Matthias Beer (CSU)

Area
  - Total: 72.54 km^{2} (28.01 sq mi)
- Elevation: 467 m (1,532 ft)

Population (2025-12-31)
  - Total: 5,664
  - Density: 78.08/km^{2} (202.2/sq mi)
- Time zone: UTC+01:00 (CET)
  - Summer (DST): UTC+02:00 (CEST)
- Postal codes: 93176
- Dialling codes: 09493
- Vehicle registration: R
- Website: www.beratzhausen.de

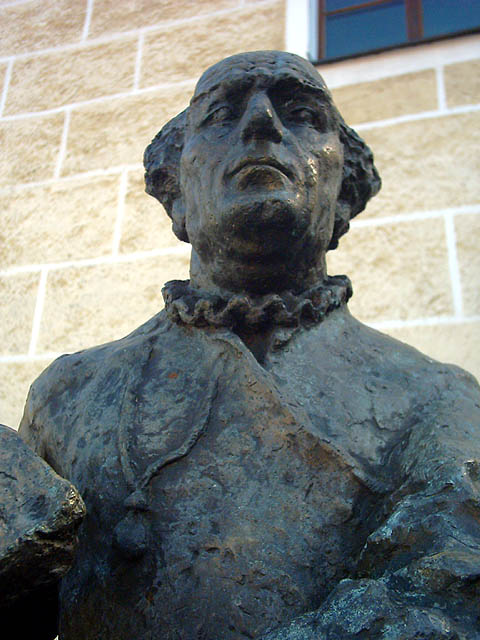
Monument to Paracelsus in front of the former tithe barn in Beratzhausen.

Beratzhausen is a market town and municipality in the district of Regensburg in Bavaria in Germany.
