= Alterius non sit qui suus esse potest =

Latin phrase

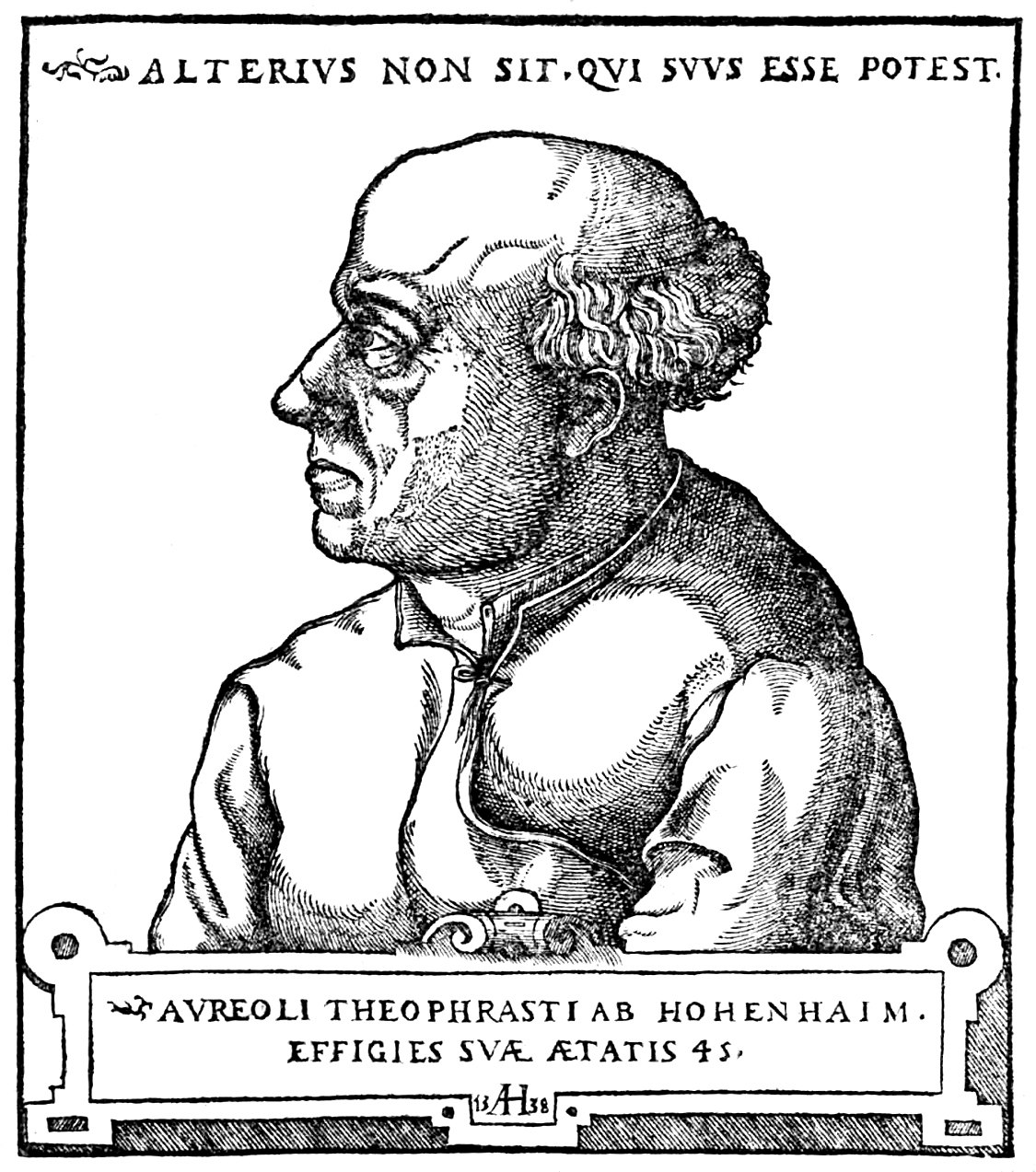
Portrait of Paracelsus attributed to Augustin Hirschvogel (1538), upon which the phrase is shown.

Alterius non sit qui suus esse potest is latin phrase.

It means "Let no man, who can belong to himself, belong to another.”

This phrase is referenced from the Aesopian fable De ranis (Of the Frogs, Snake and Wood). The fable's author is suspected to be an anonymous medieval person who may have been Gualterus Anglicus.

The Italian version has the title of Le rane chiedono un re. The English version has the title of The Frogs Who Wished for a King. The lesson of the tale is that relinquishing individual autonomy in the pursuit of order results in a false protector, or worse, a predatory overlord.

The phrase was the personal motto of Philippus Aureolus Theophrastus Bombastus von Hohenheim (Paracelsus) who had it inscribed, in German, to his portraits.

Cicero in De re publica (book III, 28) also wrote in similar vein, «est enim genus iniustae servitutis, cum hi sunt alterius, qui sui possunt esse» (It is not just for subjects to fall into subservience who are, due to their qualities and capabilities, shall be free). It means that only in such rare case of capability for potential independence that the slavery be considered unjust.
