= Benedictus Figulus =

German alchemist, publisher and Rosicrucian

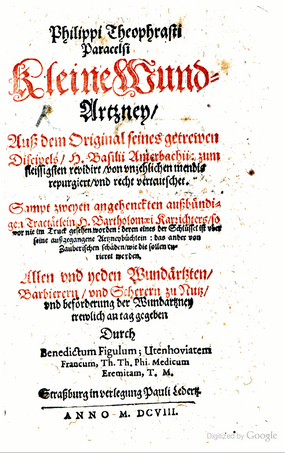

Benedictus Figulus (29 December 1567 – after 1619) of was a German alchemist, publisher, and Rosicrucian from Uttenhofen. He was an editor of Paracelsian texts and an important representative of Paracelsianism in the early 17th century.

== Life ==
At the beginning of the 1610s, he was commissioned by the printer Lazare Zetzner to prepare a second edition of the great alchemical anthology, the Theatrum Chemicum, of which he projected three new volumes under the passably mystical title Théâtre d'or tout nouveau et béni, rayonnant des opulentes richesses du présent siècle d'or, rempli des ouvrages jusqu'alors inconnus, des plus excellents philosophes, tant anciens que modernes, traitant de la grande merveille bénie et du miraculeux mystère de la pierre physique et tinctoriale, de sa préparation et de son acquisition. (Theatre of gold all new and blessed, shining from its opulent riches of the present golden century, full of works even unknown, of most excellent philosophers, both ancient and modern, treating the great blessed marvel and the miraculous mystery of the physical stone and tinctorial, of its preparation and its acquisition.) This was at the time when Rosicrucianism was emerging, and Figulus's friend Adam Haslmayr, an early proponent of Rosicrucianism, was arrested. Worried, Figulus abandoned his work and fled.

== Works ==
- Carmen heroicum, Insignia Megalandri Lutheri complectens, Stuttgart 1600
- Paraphrasis Graeco-Latina Psalmi XXIII Regii propheta Davidis carmine Alcaico expressa: Item Psalmi CIII poetica versio Trilinguis, 1603
- Pandora magnalium naturalium aurea et benedicta de Paracelse, Lazare Zetzner, Strasbourg 1608
- Paradisus aureolus hermeticus: fluens nectare et ambrosia, Frankfurt, W. Richter, 1608
- Rosarium novum olympicum et benedictum, das ist : Ein newer gebenedeyter philosophischer Rosengart, Basel 1608
- Kleine Wundarzney de Paracelse, Strasbourg 1608
- Thesaurinella olympica aurea tripartita, Frankfurt 1608

In 1893 Arthur Edward Waite translated Pandora magnalium naturalium aurea et benedicta into English as A Golden Casket of Nature's Marvels. It contains The Book of the Revelation of Hermes interpreted by Theophrastus Paracelsus Concerning the Supreme Secret of the World, and tracts by Figulus, Alexander von Suchten, Conrad Poyselius, and others.

== Sources ==
- Theatrum Paracelsicum: Prefaces and Dedications written by Benedictus Figulus
