= Helisaeus Roeslin =

German physician and astrologer (1545–1616)

- Born: 17 January 1545
- Died: 16 August 1616 (aged 71)
- Scientific career
- Fields: Astrology

Helisaeus Roeslin or Helisäus Röslin (17 January 1545 – 14 August 1616) was a German physician and astrologer who adopted a geoheliocentric model of the universe. Roeslin attended the University of Tübingen in order to become a physician. After becoming a physician Roeslin became very interested in astrology as well as predicting when the second coming of Christ would occur. He was one of five observers who concluded that the Great Comet of 1577 was located beyond the Moon. His representation of the comet, described as "an interesting, though crude, attempt," was among the earliest and was highly complex. Roeslin also came to the conclusion independently that it was the Sun not the Earth that was center of the Solar System. Today Helisaeus Roeslin is best remembered for his controversies and involvement with geo-heliocentric world systems and for writing books about astronomy. Some of his works consist of a Ratio Studiorum et operum, the Tabella, and De opere Dei creationis.

== Life ==
Roeslin was born in Plieningen (now part of Stuttgart). Had known Johannes Kepler since their student days and was one of his correspondents. Roeslin placed more emphasis on astrological predictions than did Kepler, and though he respected Kepler as a mathematician, he rejected some of Kepler's cosmological principles, including Copernican theory. Kepler criticized Roeslin's predictions in his book De stella nova, on the comet of 1604, and the two kept up their arguments in a series of pamphlets written as dialogues.

Roeslin's 1597 book De opere Dei creationis is regarded as one of the major works in the late 16th-century controversy over the formulation of a geoheliocentric world system. Robert Burton refers to Roeslin in his Anatomy of Melancholy.

By 1580 Roeslin had finished his book, Speculum et harmonia mundi, however he needed a patron in order to get his book published. At the time Roeslin was physician-in-ordinary to the count palatine of Veldenz and the count of Hanau-Lichtenberg in Buchsweiler in Alsace, Georg Hans I van Pfolz-Veldenz. Pfolz-Vaeldenz ended up taking on the role of an intermediary between Roeslin and John III, the King of Sweden. In the end though King John III did not become Roeslin's patron. Roeslin also inquired about two German princes becoming his patron; Johann I, count Palatine and Wilhelm IV, Landgrave of Hesse-Kassei. Wilhelm IV was a promoter of astronomical studies and was very well known within the astronomical community. However, just as was the case with King John III of Sweden, Count Johann I and Langrave Wilhelm IV did not become patrons of Roeslin.

Between the years 1603 and 1604 Roeslin wrote a Ratio Studiorum et operum which consisted of three parts. Part one was a chronology. Part two was a history of the world titled Speculum mundi et ecclesiae. Part three was a cosmological assessment of the universe and was titled Philosophium opus Dei creations. Part three had similar content to Roeslin's book, De opere Dei creations which was only published a few years earlier, in the year 1597. The purpose of Roeslin's Ratio Studiorum et operum was to compile a chronological history of Earth including astronomical occurrences and then compare the compiled history to prophecies from both the Old and New Testaments of the Bible. Roeslin hoped that by making this comparison that he would be able to date when the Earth was created and also project when the end of the world would happen. Roeslin also projected the end of the world in his first manuscript trealise as well in his book, the Tabella. Roeslin wrote parts one and two of Ratio Studiorum et operum in the 1570s, around the time frame of the 1572 Nova, which was very inspirational for Roeslin in writing his book. The 1604 Nova was also a major factor in shaping Roeslin's book as well as the 1577 comet.

In Roeslin's first manuscript trealise and the Tabella, which was dedicated to Emperor Matthias, Roeslin attempted to convince the emperor as well as the astronomical community that the world would end in the year 1663. Roeslin came to this conclusion after collecting astronomical data and comparing it to Biblical prophesies. Roeslin believed that in the year 1663 that the world would end with the final judgment by Christ and divine punishment of human wickedness.

After Roeslin's death at Buchsweiler in 1616, his unpublished astrology, theology and kabbalistic work merged into the manuscript collection of Karl Widemann.
