= Wittenberg interpretation of Copernicus =

Work of astronomers and mathematicians at the University of Wittenberg

The Wittenberg Interpretation refers to the work of astronomers and mathematicians at the University of Wittenberg in response to the heliocentric model of the Solar System proposed by Nicholas Copernicus, in his 1543 book De revolutionibus orbium coelestium. The Wittenberg Interpretation fostered an acceptance of the heliocentric model and had a part in beginning the Scientific Revolution.

In 1543, Nicholas Copernicus changed the scientific world by publishing De revolutionibus orbium coelestium. This was the first time that a heliocentric model had seriously been considered, and publicised, and resulted in a slew of opinions on how the universe may work. One such place that these debates existed was the University of Wittenberg which was home to many astronomers, astrologists and mathematicians, such as Erasmus Reinhold, Philip Melanchthon, Caspar Peucer, Georg Rheticus, and Albrecht Hohenzollern. The work of such figures became known as the Wittenberg Interpretation, which historians recognise as important in fostering acceptance for the heliocentric explanation of the universe, and the wider shift of public views over time; and the beginning of the Scientific Revolution.

== Philipp Melanchthon ==
Philipp Melanchthon entered Wittenberg studying theology, becoming a leading figure in the Lutheran reformation of the school. During this reformation, Melanchthon introduced many courses in mathematics to Wittenberg, in addition to several other universities. His teachings included Ptolemy's Libri de judiciis astrologicis, and emphasized a connection between astronomical events and God. In 1536, Melanchthon appointed Georg Joachim Rheticus and Erasmus Reinhold, two of his previous students, to chairs of Lower and Higher Mathematics. Many scholars studied under and worked alongside Melanchthon; however, Rheticus and Reinhold, in addition to Caspar Peucer, were considered the most vital members of the Melanchthon circle, also referred to as the Wittenberg circle. The men in this circle were astronomers who, under Melanchthon’s leadership, thoroughly analysed Copernicus' theory, trying to refine it where deemed possible.

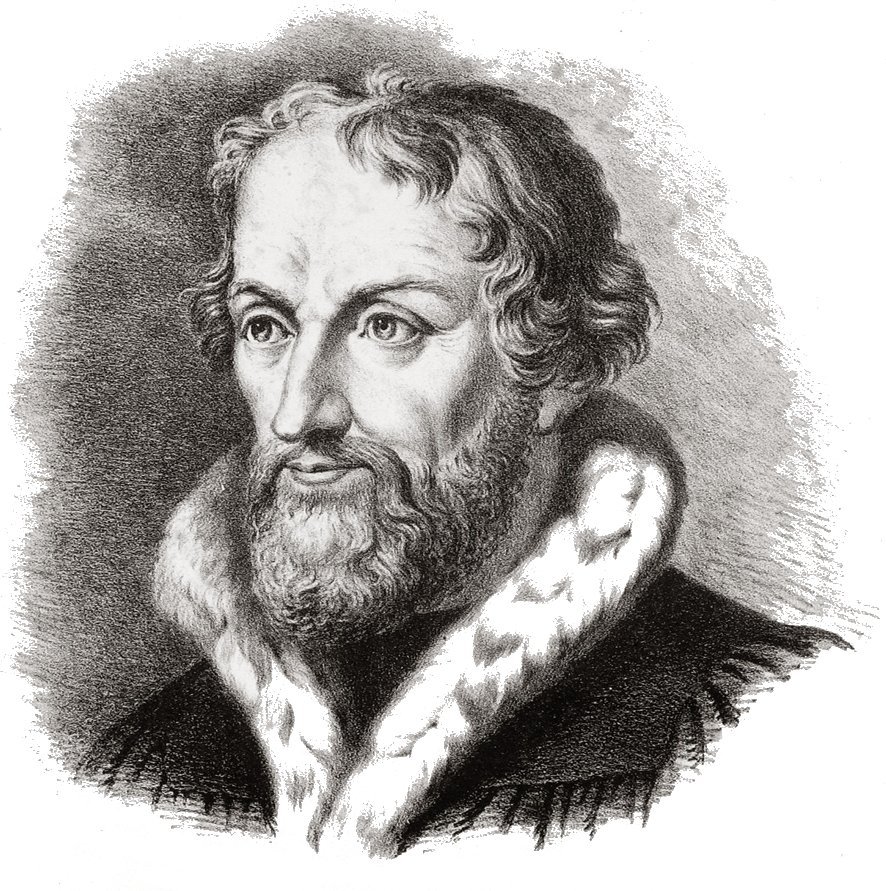
Illustration of Philipp Melanchthon

=== Philipp Melanchthon and Copernican Theory ===
Prior to the Copernican theory, Melanchthon strongly agreed with the work of Aristotle and Ptolemy. Melanchthon first became familiar with Copernican theory through Rheticus’ Narratio prima in 1540. He first took the stance that Copernicus' theory was absurd. Melanchthon’s lectures tended to reject Copernican theory as it seemed to conflict with Scripture, and advised students to avoid it. Later lectures show that Melanchthon’s views may have changed slightly, as he applauds Copernicus’ lunar theory and suggests it is worth looking at. However, Melanchthon continues to recommend that his students remain concerned with Ptolemaic lunar theory, as he had been teaching up to this point. Melanchthon agrees that the Earth could possibly move and rotate like Copernicus suggests even though it does not agree with Scripture. Throughout his time studying and lecturing on Copernican theory, Melanchthon never ignores the fact that Copernicus defies Scripture, an idea which Melanchthon openly disapproves of. However, Melanchthon seems to agree that this new theory has value to the subject of astronomy and there must be something worth learning from Copernicus' theory and therefore doesn’t reject it entirely. Like the members of the Melanchthon circle, Melanchthon himself does not fully accept or fully reject Copernican theory, but is instead more moderate. His moderate stance allowed others to view Copernicus' theory from an open point of view.

== Caspar Peucer ==
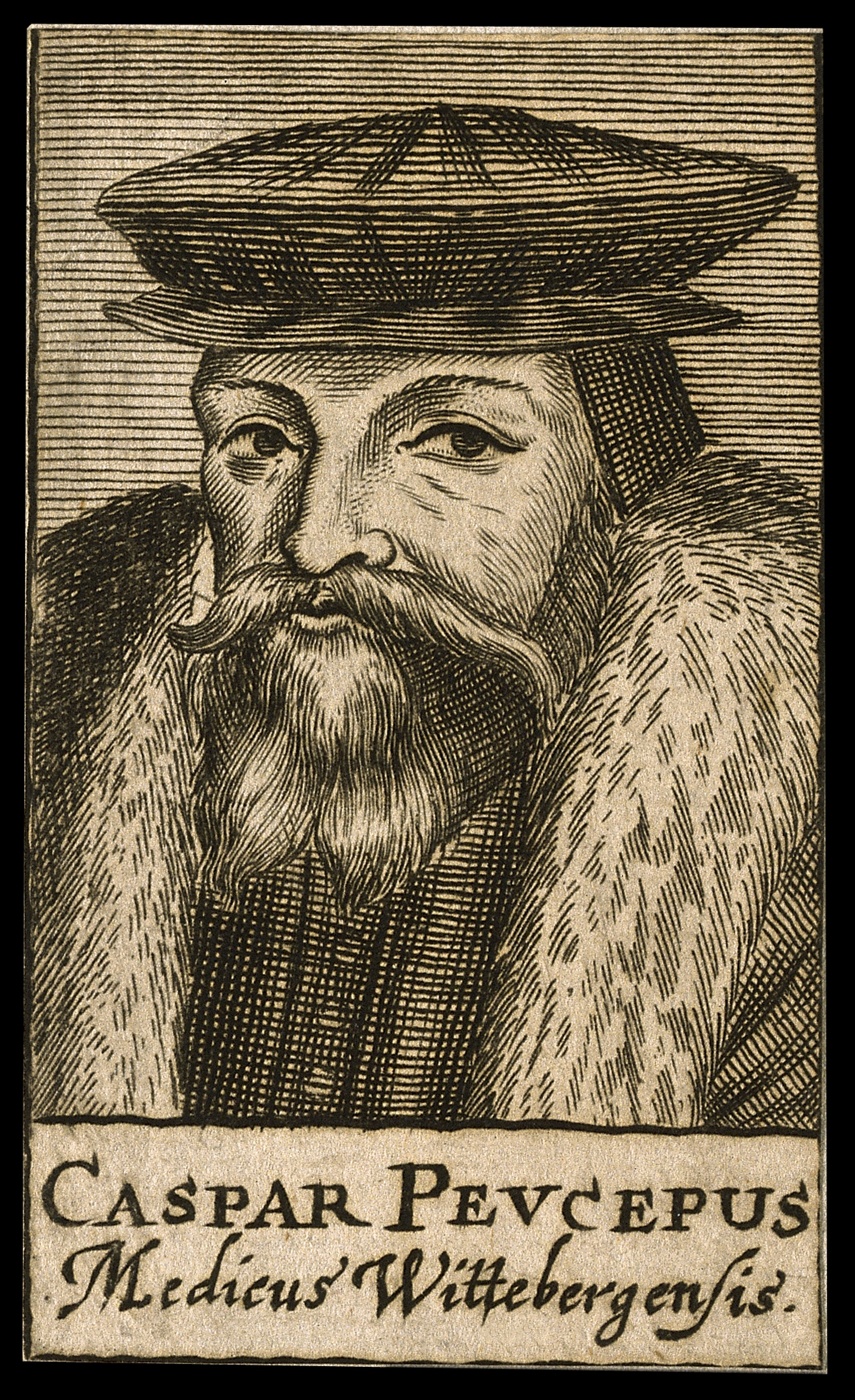
Illustration of Caspar Peucer.

Caspar Peucer (1525–1602) entered the University of Wittenburg in 1540. There, he studied astronomy, mathematics, and medicine under the teachings of Philipp Melanchthon, Erasmus Reinhold and Georg Joachim Rheticus. Shortly thereafter, he became a professor at the university and the son-in-law of Melanchthon when he married his daughter Magdalena. Considered one of the most important disciples to carry on the teachings of Melanchthon, he eventually held a high position within the university and was able to convey the Melanchthon Circle’s interpretations of the Copernican theory. Peucer is accredited with being able to effectively consolidate and institutionalize the Wittenburg Interpretation at German universities. He was able to do this by choosing to place Philippists (partisans of Melanchthon) in influential positions instead of orthodox Lutherans. This strategic placement eventually lead to a power struggle which resulted in Peucer being charged with being a crypto-Calvinist and incarcerated in 1576. After his incarceration, his work in astronomy ceased and he focused on practicing medicine.

=== Caspar Peucer and Copernican Theory ===
While teaching the curriculum to entry-level natural science students the importance of teaching arithmetic, physics, and astrological teachings of Aristotle, Pliny, Sacrobosco, and Ptolemy was emphasized. An introduction to the Copernican theory was also included within the curriculum, although limited. Peucer mainly cited Copernican quantitative material in order to help explain celestial motions, even though it was different from scripture, and to discuss absolute distances of the sun, moon and earth. He also utilized Copernican data to discuss eclipses and the length of the day. In Peucer’s teachings, the findings of Copernicus could not be utilized in extensive arguments because he was considered to be aligned with the theory of Aristarchus. Peucer thought that Copernicanism was offensive and should not be taught in education; however, although Peucer’s views did not align with Copernican theory, he still had to teach and advised his students to consider Copernican theory because it was a scientific theory.Peucer's views on Copernican theory mirrored the views of his mentors Melanchthon and Reinhold. Between the members of the Melanchthon Circle, each instructor made up a different pedagogic element in the Wittenberg Interpretation. An element of the interpretation that all of the members could agree in teaching was that only a dedicated scholar is capable of understanding astrology and the celestial elements that drive it. Caspar Peucer was particularly determined to examine the properties of celestial "qualitates occultae". Notably, the members of the circle admired the teachings of Italian scholars, with Rheticus supporting the views of Girolamo Cardano, and Peucer being well read in the works of Pietro Pomponazzi.

Peucer in particular supported Martin Luther's opposition of Aristotle's view on natural philosophy. He strongly believed that unusual events that did not follow the natural laws was due to divine intervention either by God or the devil. Copernicus's heliocentric theory was inspired by the research of Aristotle and firmly followed the laws of natural science without consideration for divine intervention. That being said, at the introductory level Copernican theory was not entertained extensively because Peucer and other members of the circle believed the mechanisms to be too advanced for an introduction to planetary movements. At the Masters level, Copernican theory was covered more in depth, as well as treated with the same serious consideration Ptolemaic theory received. This higher, in depth level of Copernicans theory was likely taught by pupils of Peucer. Peucer thought that the Copernican theory, heliocentric model could be interpreted in a geocentric way without changing the original hypotheses. Peucer's work Hypotyposes orbium coelestium states that the Copernican model could be utilized if two more spheres were added. While Caspar Peucer acknowledges that the models and theories of Ptolemy are geometrically accurate, the absence of cosmological choice and incorporation of scriptural arguments made the theories lacking. The issues Peucer had with the work of Copernicus are similar to the Church's trouble with the work of Galileo Galilei that landed him in trouble. Ironically, the ideas that got Peucer in jail were his views on Holy Communion.

== Erasmus Reinhold ==
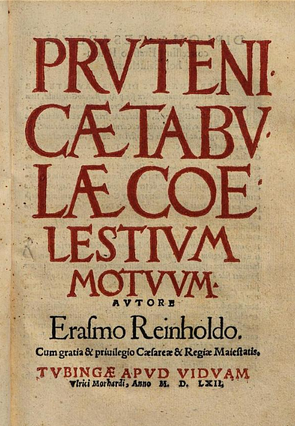
The first edition of Erasmus Reinhold's Prutenic Tables. Published in 1551.

Erasmus Reinhold was born in Saalfeld, Saxony in 1511. In 1536, Philipp Melanchthon appointed Reinhold to professor of higher mathematics, a subject which included astronomy, at the University of Wittenberg where Reinhold had previously studied. Reinhold initially became acquainted with Copernican theory through the writings of Georg Joachim Rheticus, an astronomer and colleague who also worked closely with Melanchthon at the University. Before De Revolutionibus orbium coelestium was published, Reinhold gained information regarding Copernican theory, specifically regarding the movement of the moon, from Narratio prima. This book was written by Rheticus, and provided his analysis of Copernican theory. Reinhold believed in uniform circular motion and that two equal and regular circular motions will create a motion in a straight line, an infinite opposite motion, and an unequal motion where it is slower towards the outside than it is in the center. Based on his knowledge of Copernicus’s lunar theory, gained from Rheticus's Narratio prima, Reinhold praised Copernican theory. This is seen in Reinhold’s annotations within Peurbach’s New Theorics of the Planets, published in 1542. In these notes, Reinhold mentions his dissatisfaction with the lack of understanding in modern astronomy, yet also mentions how Copernicus’s lunar theory restores his hope. In additional annotations, Reinhold continually mentions how new Copernican theory simplifies astronomical motion by erasing the need for an equant, an idea previously introduced by the geocentric model of the Ptolemaic system. Reinhold was very impressed by Copernicans ability to remove the equant in his theory of the cosmos. This new idea, the rejection of the equant, is the source of Reinhold’s praise of Copernicus and Copernican theory, as it simplifies planetary motion and in his opinion, allows for the future of astronomy to move forward in a smoother, less confusing or cluttered manner. He believed God had allowed Copernicus to discover the movement celestial beings and remove the equant even though it was different from the scripture of the time.

After the publication of De revolutionibus orbium coelestium in 1543, Reinhold remained relatively neutral on the issue of a heliocentric versus a geocentric cosmos. However, he wanted to recalculate and provide clean and simple-to-read tables based on the new ideas of motion presented in De revolutioninus. Reinhold did exactly this as he wrote and published the Prutenic Tables. He utilized Copernicans observational data, even though he did not agree with Copernicans heliocentric cosmos, and created the tables based upon Copernicans planetary mechanisms. Melanchthon thoroughly supported this new compilation of tables of motion, and even helped secure funding from Albrecht, the Duke of Prussia, for the publishing the Prutenic Tables.

== Georg Joachim Rheticus ==
Georg Joachim Rheticus, most commonly known as Rheticus, was well known for his trigonometric tables and considered a pupil of Copernicus. He was born on February 16, 1514, in Feldkirch, in present day as Austria. After his father’s execution, Rheticus went on to study at the Latin school in Feldkirch, then went to Zurich where he attended the Frauenmuensterschule from 1528 to 1531. In 1533, he began his studies at the University of Wittenberg. Then in 1536, Philipp Melanchthon, an influential educator in Germany, appointed Rheticus appointed Rheticus as the chair of Lower Mathematics to teach astronomy and mathematics at Wittenberg. Two years after being appointed, Rheticus was given a two year leave of Wittenberg to study alongside other well-known astronomers at that time. His colleagues at Wittenberg described Rheticus’s personality as abnormal and enthusiastic, with homosexual tendencies. They perceived Rheticus as a man who would get caught up by the fame and knowledge of older men, and would fantasize about them. This led them to believe that was the sole purpose of Rheticus asking Melanchthon for the leave of absence from Wittenberg was for Rheticus to become closer to Copernicus. Rheticus’s fantasy to work with Copernicus may have been true. However, several factors suggest that Rheticus first learned of Copernicus during his travel across Germany in late 1538. After these two met, their relationship grew strong through sharing revolutionary ideas. Rheticus ended up staying with Copernicus for two and a half years. Rheticus had acquired a father figure in Copernicus and Copernicus acquired the only real student he would ever have.

=== Rheticus and Copernican theory ===
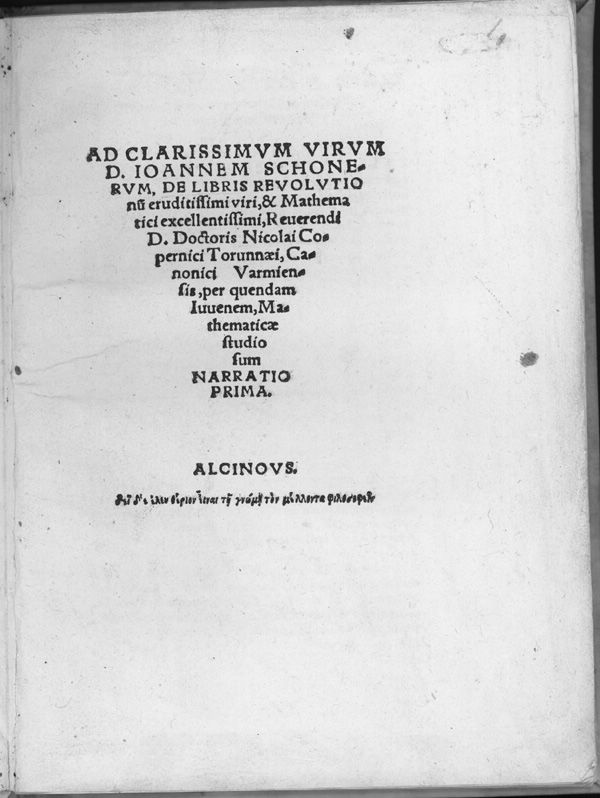
Cover of Rheticus' Narratio Prima, first published account on Copernican theory

Unlike the other students of Melanchthon, Reinhold and Peucer, who doubted Copernicus’s theory, Rheticus praised Copernicus for asserting an ‘absolute system’ of the planets. In 1540, Rheticus wrote the De libris revolutionum Copernici narratio prima, commonly known as Narratio prima, an introduction to the theories of Copernicus. Along with the publication, he visited a publisher and printer in Nuremberg in order to push Copernicus to publish his work De Revolutionibus orbium coelestium. Copernicus developed his heliocentric theory after realizing that the retrograde motion of the planets could be explained much better without epicycles, with the Earth orbiting the Sun rather than the other way around. Rheticus believed that the heliocentric universe should be adopted because it could explain the phenomena of the precession of the equinoxes and the change in the obliquity of the ecliptic. If the Sun was the center of the deferents of the planets, it allowed the circles in the universe to revolve uniformly and regularly, it united all the spheres into one system, and it was a simpler model with fewer explanations necessary. Rheticus also accepted Copernicans' idea of the moon moving on and epicycle rather than its movement on an equant (1). Rheticus's time visiting Copernicus allowed for his theory to become known since he was able to push Copernicus into publishing his work to be read by others.

Wittenberg textbooks emphasized the problems of the Copernican theory and how it related to the calendar, lunar motion, and the rejection of the equant. The Narratio prima also contained ideas that were not found in De revolutionibus or in any of Copernicus’s other writings. The book emphasized the demonstration of a system in the necessary interconnexity of the relative distance and periods of the planets, a problem in the Copernican theory that the textbooks did not mention. Rheticus claimed that a common measure was established to explain how the planets were geometrically aligned and arranged so that no immense interval was left between one and the other. His claim made three assumptions about the planetary models: that each planet is carried by a uniformly revolving sphere, that the principle of plenitude states, there are no gaps between the spheres, and that the relative planetary positions are to be measured with respect to a common unit. He wanted to eliminate the earth’s projected motion which appeared as the epicycles in earth-centered planetary models, allowing for the planets to be placed continuously based on their mean periodic motions.

Copernicus and Rheticus both knew that there would be backlash. One theologian, Andreas Osiander, in order to forestall censorship of Copernicus's work, wrote an anonymous preface that described the work as a pure hypothesis. Rheticus became furious and crossed out the preface in those copies of De revolutionibus that he came across. The Church also emphasized that Copernicus’s theory was against scripture and believed that the world revolved around the Earth and were persistent with the Earth being in the center. Some science was frowned upon by the church because it was uncertain in the Bible, and certain knowledge of physics is not necessary to human salvation. However, knowledge of astronomy is demanded of great men by God. The Copernican theory indicates that the earth is a planet, that all planets have defects, and all are subject only to circular motions. Rheticus argues that these characteristics are not a physical problem but a mathematical one. With this claim, he aimed to shift the perspective of the Church so that the theory could be explained mathematically, which would be more acceptable since it represented direct testimony of God’s Providence and God gave clues to it in Scripture.

== Albrecht Hohenzollern ==
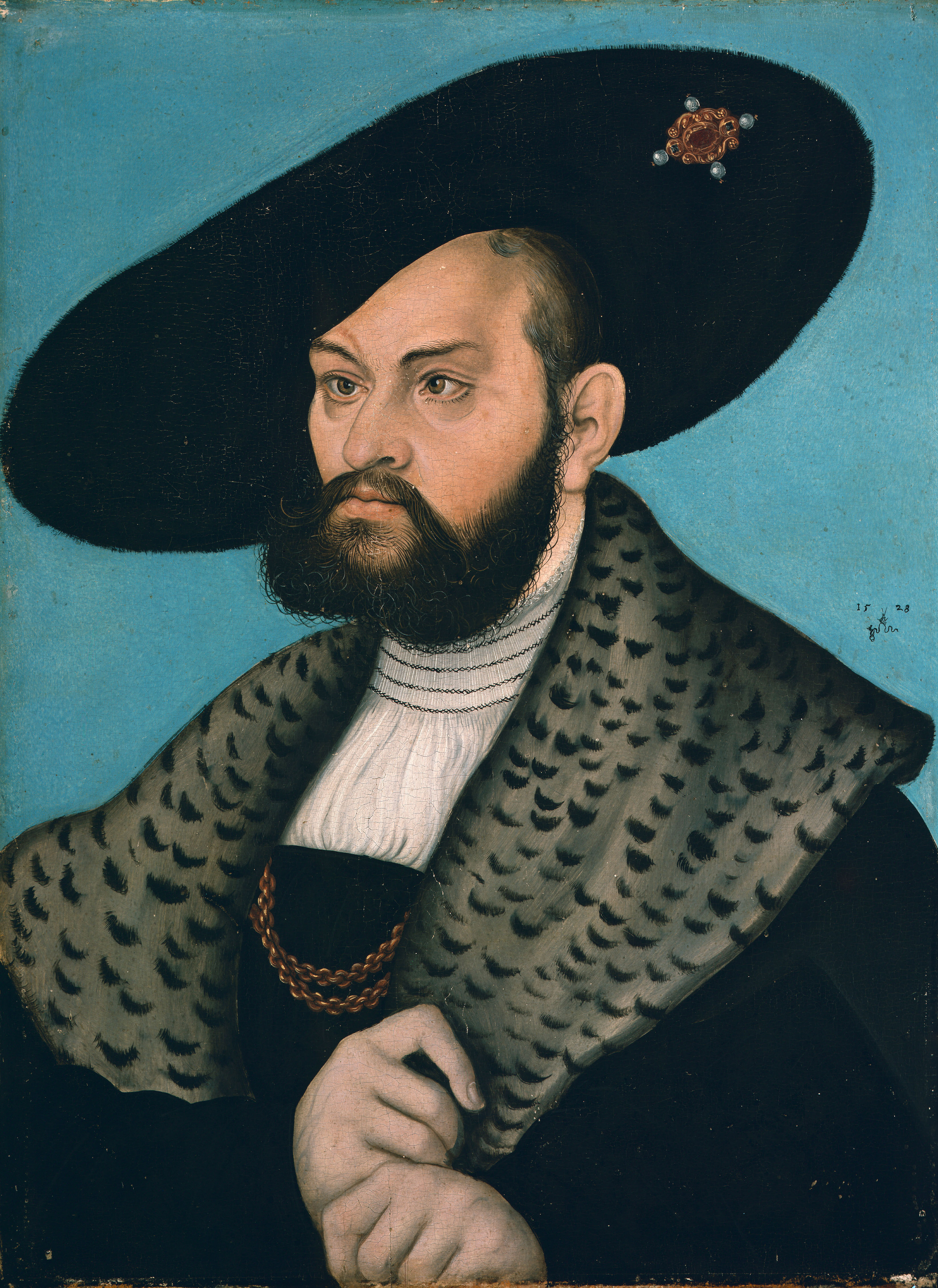
Albrecht Hohenzollern. Portrait of Margrave Albrecht of Brandenburg-Ansbach, Duke of Prussia

Albrecht (Albert), Duke of Prussia was not only the first Duke of Prussia, but also a Lutheran, who believed strongly in the importance of students learning mathematics, astronomy, and other scientific topics. Religion was a very important part of Albrecht’s life: his rule of Prussia was crucial to the spread of Lutheranism, as he was the first leader in Europe to rule his people under it. It is somewhat surprising that Albrecht remained so interested and invested in the sciences, as there were many debates at the time as to whether or not the new astronomical considerations went against the views of the world in the Bible. Despite these conflicts, Albrecht was a fairly well-liked ruler. His religious beliefs led to him acting as a “protector” of sorts, and at various times he supported both Rheticus and Reinhold. The Prutenic Tables are named in his honor.

=== Albrecht's Influence at Wittenberg ===
One reason Albrecht was able to balance his religious and scientific beliefs was his close personal relationship with Philip Melanchthon, which helped to further shape his belief in these scientific systems, causing him to even go so far as to appointment a court astrologer, Johann Carion. Albrecht was also considered a very important “protector” of people like Copernicus and Rheticus. As he was a Protestant/Lutheran, these men knew that he had the power to protect them from being charged with the crime of spreading beliefs that went against the current interpretation of the Bible. In April of 1540, Albrecht’s associate, Giese, sent to Albrecht a copy of Rheticus's Narratio prima, which included very high praise of Prussia, and a request by Rheticus to come study and continue his work in Prussia, specifically at Albrecht's court. However, he also hinted at the fact that he wanted to be protected, as he was a Lutheran and knew that Albrecht was as well. Despite the fact that Albrecht had never heard of this new mathematician before, he obliged: he sent back a “lisbonino”, which was a gold coin that was meant for showcasing, rather than being used as currency. This was a truly important move, as it allowed Rheticus to continue his studies and work in Prussia, and led to Rheticus's later appointment at Leipzig. Albrecht’s contribution to the Wittenberg interpretation was one that had profound implications. Allowing Rheticus to come to Prussia allowed him to further his own studies, which in turn solidified the heliocentric model.

== Conclusion ==
Most of the astronomers and mathematicians at Wittenberg (Melanchthon, Peucer, Reinhold) took a more moderate stance toward the Copernican theory and only accepted parts of it to be true. This was due to the fact that most of Copernican’s ideas went against the scripture at the time and having ideas that were different from the scripture were frowned upon and not easily accepted. However, Rheticus strongly supported Copernicus after visiting with him and his time studying in Prussia alongside Albrecht. Rheticus came to the conclusion that Copernican’s heliocentric model made more sense than the previous geocentric model suggested by Ptolemy. His open views on the Copernican theory allowed others to be able to view the theory with an open mind. While all the teachers at the University of Wittenberg had different ideas and acceptances of the cosmos they all taught their students about both Ptolemy’s cosmos and Copernican’s cosmos to give their students a well-rounded education. Overall, the Wittenberg Interpretation changed the way astronomers and mathematicians viewed the heliocentric and geocentric models of the cosmos and how it was taught throughout German universities.

== Bibliography ==
- Barker, Peter, Tredwell, Katherine Anne. (2005). The exact sciences in Lutheran Germany and Tudor England. OCLC 1035379995.
- Brosseder, Claudia (2005). "The Writing in the Wittenberg Sky: Astrology in Sixteenth-Century Germany". Journal of the History of Ideas. 66(4): 557–576. ISSN 0022-5037.
- Copernicus, Nicolaus (1952), On the Revolutions of the Heavenly Spheres, Great Books of the Western World, 16, translated by Charles Glenn Wallis, Chicago: William Benton
- Danielson, Dennis Richard (2006-10-31). The First Copernican: Georg Joachim Rheticus and the Rise of the Copernican Revolution. Bloomsbury Publishing USA. ISBN 978-0-8027-1530-2.
- Evans, James (December 1984). "On the function and the probable origin of Ptolemy's equant". American Journal of Physics. 52 (12): 1080–1089. doi:10.1119/1.13764 ISSN 0002-9505.
- Gingerich, Owen (1973). "From Copernicus to Kepler: Heliocentrism as Model and as Reality". Proceedings of the American Philosophical Society. 117 (6): 513–522. ISSN 0003-049X.
- Gingerich, Owen (1973). "The role of Erasmus Reinhold and the Prutenic Tables in the Dissemination of Copernican Theory", Studia Copernicana, 6
- Grafton, Anthony (2017). "The Middleman:. American Scientist. 2017-02-06.
- Kraai, Jesse (200). "Rheticus' Heliocentric Providence: a study concerning the astrology, astronomy of the sixteenth century".
- Rabin, Sheila (2019), Zalta, Edward N. (ed.), "Nicolaus Copernicus", The Stanford Encyclopedia of Philosophy (Fall 2019), Metaphysics Research Lab, Stanford University.
- Vermij, Rienk (2010). "A Science of Signs. Aristotelian Meteorology in Reformation Germany". Early Science and Medicine. 15 (6): 648–674. ISSN 1383-7427.
- Westman, Robert S. (1975). "The Melanchthon Circle, Rheticus, and the Wittenberg Interpretation of the Copernican Theory". Isis. 66 (2): 165–193. ISSN 0021-1753.
- Westman, Robert S. (2011). "The Copernican Question: Prognostication, Skepticism, and Celestial Order" ISBN 9780520254817
- Ferry, Patrick T. (1993). "The Guiding Lights of the University of Wittenberg and the Emergence of Copernican Astronomy". Concordia Theological Quarterly.
- Tupikova, Irina and Omodeo, Pietro (2013) "The Post-Copernican Reception of Ptolemy: Erasmus Reinhold's Commented Edition of the Almagest, Book One (Wittenberg, 1549)". Journal for the History of Astronomy.
