= Valentin Naboth =

German mathematician, astronomer, and astrologer (1523–1593)

Valentin Naboth (also spelled Valentine Naibod or Nabod) (13 February 1523 (Note: Giovanni di Strassoldo writes in a letter to Giovanni Antonio Magini the following: << Valentinus Nabodus Exphardiensis matheseos professor doctissimus in Accademia Coloniensi, natus anno 1523, 13 Februarij, Hor. 18, min. 32. Mercurium habuit iunctum Lunae in Aquario domo 12^{ma} >> le hore s'intendono P.M. According to Astrowiki Hor. 18, min. 32. P.M. should be counted from noon February 13, meaning that Naboth was actually born 6:32 A.M. February 14, Valentine's Day.) – 3 March 1593), known by the Latinized name Valentinus Nabodus, was a German mathematician, astronomer and astrologer.

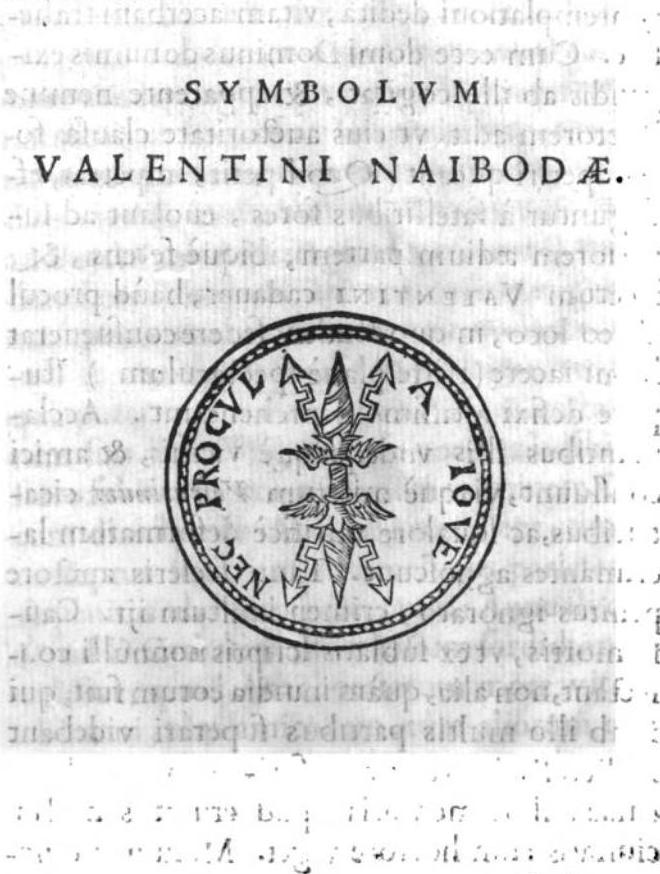
Symbolum Valentini Naibodae Sceptrum Jovis Fulmineum Cum Inscriptione: NEC PROCUL A JOVE

== Life and academic career ==
Valentin Naboth was born in Calau (Niederlausitz) (Note: The student Matrikel of Wittenberg has the following entry: Valentinus Neboth Kalensis. Gratis inscripsi. Anfang 1544, while the Matrikel of Erfurt has: Valentinus Naboth Callensis. 'Calensis' stands for 'from Calau'. Furthermore, in the introduction to his book De calculatoria numerorumque natura Sectiones quatuor (1556) Naboth identifies himself as Valentinus Nabodus Lusitanus, i.e. 'from Lusatia'.) to a formerly Jewish family. He was the younger brother of the Lutheran theologian and author Alexius Naboth. In 1544, Valentin matriculated at the University of Wittenberg. At that time Philipp Melanchthon, Erasmus Reinhold, Johannes Bugenhagen, Paul Eber, and Georg Major taught there. In 1550 he transferred to the University of Erfurt.

Valentin Naboth already held the Baccalaureat when he came from Wittenberg to Erfurt, and certainly had outstanding mathematical abilities. The Faculty council risked turning the courses in Mathematics over to this gifted but troubled Renaissance spirit even though he had not yet completed a Magister degree. That decision was made at the meeting of 16 August 1551, and from then on Naboth taught Mathematics and the beginning astronomy course, the Sphaera materialis. He also taught in the summer semester and winter semester of 1552. There was a plague epidemic, and the courses were shortened; Liborius Mangold taught only rhetoric and Naboth only the Sphaera. The conscientious Liborius Mangold from Warburg, who was Dean, did not seem to get along with the much favored mathematician Naboth, and when the latter even borrowed money from the University for the Magister's examination, Liborius wrote to the Dean's book, that this was "never before seen or heard of" (quod prius nunquam nec visum nec auditum fuit). Valentin Naboth passed the examination. But right after he had received his Magister's degree, he wrote an impertinent letter to the Faculty. Shortly afterwards Liborius Mangold gave up after twelve years as rector of St. Georgsburse and as professor of physics and rhetoric, and accepted an administrative position in his native town of Warburg, and Naboth left as well. Naboth went to the University of Cologne and matriculated there with the ambition to teach mathematics at this major University – which he did.

From 1555 Naboth taught mathematics at the University of Cologne, first privately, and from 1557 to 1564 as the holder of a "City" Professorship of mathematics. He succeeded Justus Velsius, who in 1556, on account of teachings deemed heretical by the Church, was obliged to leave Cologne. Dutch mathematician Rudolph Snellius was one of his students in Cologne. In 1556 he published the first book of Euclid (1556), and then his own mathematical commentary on the Arab astrologer Alchabitius (1560), in which he opposed magic and superstition. In his mathematical work he followed Regiomontanus; but later he preferred Ptolemy – in agreement with Cardanus. He prepared an edition of Ptolemy's Quadripartitum, but that was never published. In his commentary, he thanked the City that they had supported him in the early years, when mathematics was the only discipline not yet integrated into the general University curriculum. If this remark is true, then the official Professorship of Mathematics had in fact only just been established. However, in 1563 Laurentianer Petrus Linner requested that Naboth's lecture be moved to another time, since he himself taught mathematics at his Gymnasium at the very same time. Furthermore, he argued that Naboth lacked a Magister degree from Cologne. And indeed, the Dean decided that henceforth no one could teach a course in the Schola Artium while a lecture was taking place in one of three Gymnasiums. In March 1564 Naboth resigned from his position at the University of Cologne. He visited Paris, where he met Czech humanist Šimon Proxenus ze Sudetu (1532–1575), who introduced him to Petrus Ramus. Afterwards Naboth traveled to Italy, eventually settling in Padua, the center of the mathematical studies of that time, where he taught astronomy. Among his students there was a nephew of Prince Stephen Báthory of Transylvania. He had always been an eccentric, and became even more so.

== Work ==
Naboth was the author of a general textbook on astrology Enarratio elementorum astrologiae. Renowned for calculating the mean annual motion of the Sun, his writings are chiefly devoted to commenting upon Ptolemy and the Arabian astrologers. Naboth teaches the calculation of the movement of the planets according to the Prutenic Tables of Erasmus Reinhold. He advocated a measure of time, by which 0° 59' 8 1/3" (the mean daily motion of the Sun in longitude) is equated to 1 year of life in calculating primary directions. This was a refinement of Ptolemy's value of exactly 1 degree per year. This book was censored by the Spanish inquisition. (Note: Naboth's Enarratio elementorum astrologiae was actually censored by the Spanish Inquisition, and appears on a list of prohibited books. The online copy of the book at the University of Seville appears to have been expurgated following the specific instructions of the Inquisitors.)

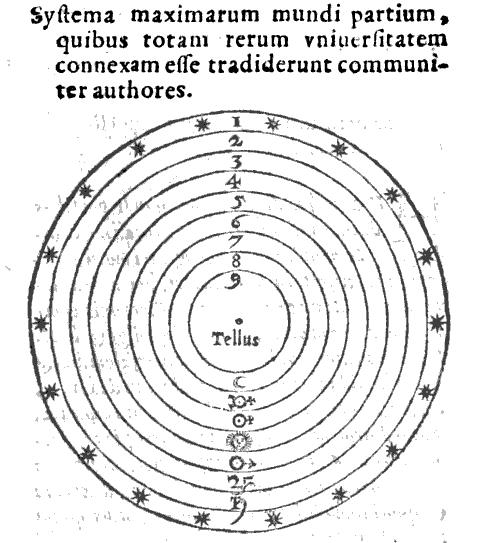

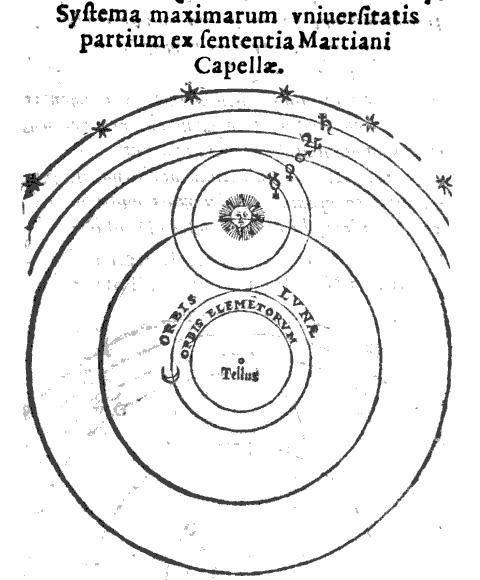

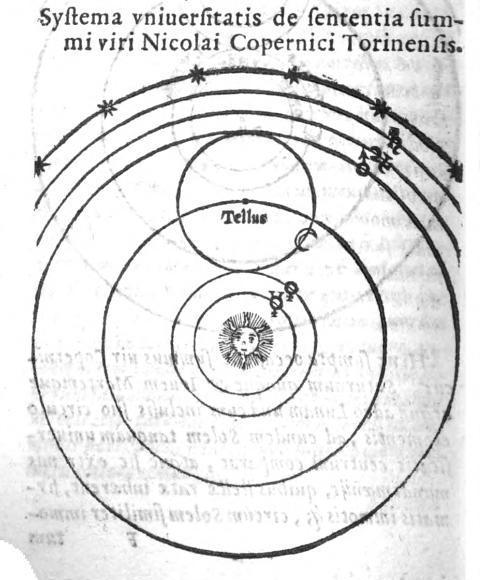

Naboth's representation of the conventional view of the Solar System (left), Martianus Capella's geo-heliocentric astronomical model (center) and Copernicus' heliocentric model.

In 1573 Naboth published an astronomy textbook for gymnasium students Primarum de coelo et terra, which was dedicated to Stephen Báthory. There can be no doubt that Naboth was working from De revolutionibus orbium coelestium when he wrote this textbook, since in this book he provides schematics of the conventional model of the Solar System, Martianus Capella's geo-heliocentric model, as well as Copernicus' heliocentric model. Tycho Brahe owned an early copy of this book, and since this book contains the first schematic representation of Capella's geo-heliocentric model it is likely that this book provided the inspiration for Tycho's geo-heliocentric model. Wittich may also have been influenced by Naboth's book in adopting the Capellan system to explain the motion of the inferior planets, and Kepler may have used this book as well. In this book Naboth introduced the expression world system (systema mundi, mundanum systema, systema universitatis, and also systema coeleste, systema caelorum and systema aethereum), a concept that was later adopted by Tycho, Kepler, and by Galilei as well.

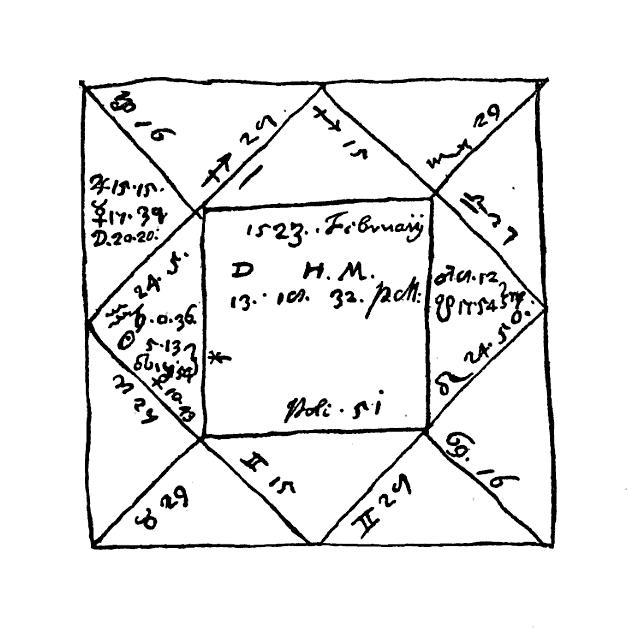
The natal chart of Valentine Naibod according to Kenelm Digby (1640).

== Final years ==
Naboth came to a bad end. Tommaso Campanella, in a work published in Lyon in 1629, tells the story that Naboth was living in Padua, Italy, when he deduced from his own horoscope that he was about to enter a period of personal danger, so he stockpiled an adequate supply of food and drink, closed his blinds, and locked his doors and windows, intending to stay in hiding until the period of danger had passed. Unfortunately, some robbers, seeing the house closed and the blinds drawn, decided that the resident was absent. They therefore broke into what they thought was an empty house, and, finding Naboth there, murdered him to conceal their identities. Thus he did not escape the fate predicted by his own astrological calculations: "Ducunt volentem fata, nolentem trahunt".

Abraham Sandeck recorded in the Acts of the German Artistennation 1593 the following event: "On the third of March, there happened a tragic incident involving Valentin Naboth of Silesia, sixty years old, a famous mathematician: he was found dead in his study, some ways away from frequently travelled areas, wounded by five wounds: one in the breast under the left nipple, another on his left side, the third in the right abdomen, the fourth under his navel, and the fifth in the left hand." (Note: III martii accidit casus pertristis Valentini Nabothi Silesii senis sexagenarii, mathematici insignis: inventus is est mortuus in musaeo suo, ab hominum consuetudine et frequentia nonnihil remoto, V vulneribus confixus; uno in pectore sub mammella sinistra, altero in latere sinistr, 3 in hypochondrio dextro, 4 sub umbilico, 5 in mano sinistra.)

== Selected works ==
- Elementorum Geometricorum liber primus, cui ex sequentibus libris accesserunt Propositiones selectae atque ita ordinatae, ut demonstrari queant observata Geometrarum Methodo, Cologne 1556.
- De calculatoria numerorumque natura Sectiones quatuor, Cologne 1556.
- Enarratio elementorvm astrologiae in qva praeter Alcabicii, qvi Arabum doctrinam compendio prodidit, expositionem, atq[ue] cum Ptolemaei principijs collationem, reiectis sortilegijs & absurdis vulgoq[ue] receptis opinionibus, de verae artis praeceptorum origine & usu satis disseritur, Cologne 1560.
- Primarum de coelo et terra institutionum quotidianarumque mundi revolutionum, libri tres, Venice (1573)
- Astronomicarum institutionum libri III, quibus doctrinae sphaericae elementa methodo nova, facili et ad captum tyronum aptissima traduntur, Venice (1580)
- De annui temporis mensura in Directionibus and De Directionibus, published by Giovanni Antonio Magini in De astrologica ratione, Venice (1607)
