= Melanchthon Circle =

The Melanchthon Circle was a 16th-century Lutheran intellectual network centred on the University of Wittenberg in Germany and its leading theologian Philip Melanchthon. It was identified as significant for its interests in natural philosophy by Lynn Thorndike, in a chapter "The Circle of Melanchthon" in his multi-volume History of Magic and Experimental Science. Among this circle were found many of the most important early proponents of the heliocentric model of Copernicus. They included Caspar Peucer who became Melanchthon's son-in-law, Erasmus Reinhold, and Georg Joachim Rheticus. Patronage came from Albert, Duke of Prussia.

== Melanchthon's views in natural philosophy ==
In lecturing on the Librorum de judiciis astrologicis of Ptolemy in 1535–36, Melanchthon expressed to students his interest in Greek mathematics, astronomy and astrology. He considered that a purposeful God had reasons to exhibit comets and eclipses. He was the first to print a paraphrased edition of Ptolemy's Tetrabiblos in Basel, 1554. Natural philosophy, in his view, was directly linked to Providence, a point of view that was influential in curriculum change after the Protestant Reformation in Germany. In the period 1536–9 he was involved in three academic innovations: the refoundation of Wittenberg along Protestant lines, the reorganisation at Tübingen, and the foundation of the University of Leipzig.

== Network around Melanchthon ==
The "Circle" was constituted in various ways: collegial and master–student relationships, compliments and favours, and career help. Typically humanist demonstrative methods, based around publications, were frequently seen. Rheticus became a great giver of books.

Before receiving a call to Wittenberg, Melanchthon had taught at the University of Tübingen. There he had been tutored in astrology by Johannes Stöffler. The network included Simon Grynaeus who remained at Tübingen; Melanchthon dedicated to him his 1531 edition of the De sphaera mundi. Melanchthon advocated astrology often: in 1531 in defending to Joachim Camerarius the work of the court astrologer Johann Carion, which he would later develop into a Lutheran historical chronicle; in a dedication to Luca Gaurico for a 1532 work by Camerarius on portents; in 1535 in an introduction to Jacob Milich's edition of Georg von Peuerbach's Planets, used again in 1542 with Reinhold's edition with a poem by Stigelius (Johannes Stigel); in 1537 in a lecture printed with his edition of the Rudimenta of Alfraganus, stating the necessity of astrology for physicians. Gaurico reciprocated, in 1540 printing eclipse observations from Melanchthon and his circle in a partial edition of Lorenzo Bonincontri.

Hieronymus Wolf, a philologist, passed through Wittenberg in the 1540s and was helped by Melanchthon. Stifelius (Michael Stiefel) had a preface for his 1543 arithmetic book; he had predicted the end of the world in 1533, had lost his living as minister in consequence, and had been found another by Melanchthon. Others mentioned by Thorndike are Vitus Amerbach, David Chytraeus, Joachim Cureus, Achilles Gassar, Joachim Heller, Johannes Hommel or Hummel, Johannes Mathesius, Johannes Mercurius Morshemius, and Johannes Schöner.
