= Gymnasium bei St. Anna =

Coordinates: 48.3549°N 10.8885°E

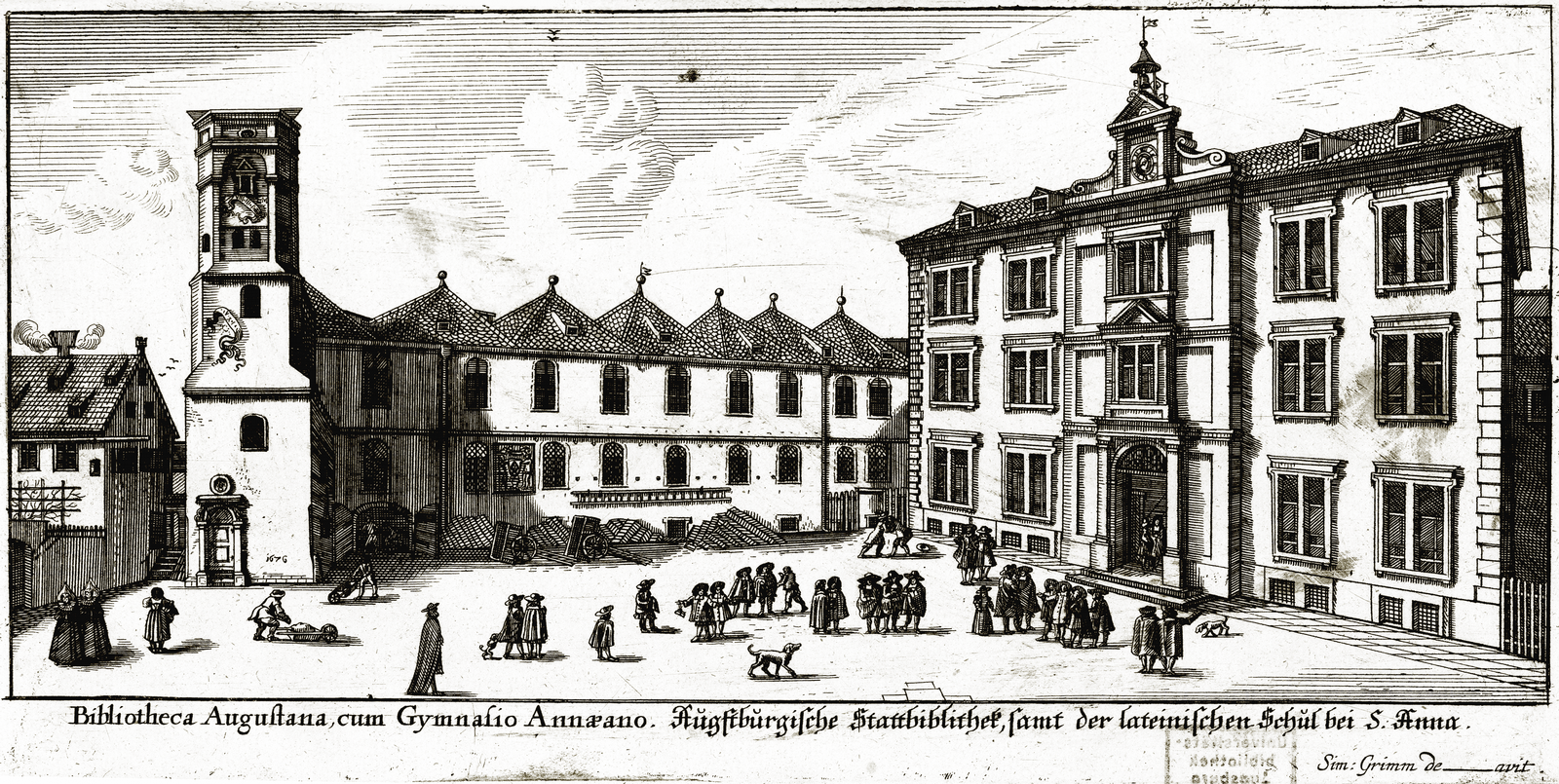
The school (right) and town library in Simon Grimm's etching of 1676

The Gymnasium bei St. Anna is a grammar school in Augsburg, Bavaria, Germany, founded in 1531 and still active.

== History ==
The school was founded in 1531 by the then predominantly Evangelical Council of the City of Augsburg as a counterweight to the Catholic cathedral and monastery schools. It was to persuade the noble families of the city about an alternative to education of their children. The prevailing practice was to hire private tutors, many of them incompetent and outmoded. St Anne Gymnasium was the school to be trusted to educate new leaders for the Protestant town. The students were from the age 7 to 16 and taught in nine classes: the literature, introduction to the dialectic ( logic), and rhetoric based on the ancient Greek and Latin, a little Hebrew. There were also teachers competent in Mathematics, Music and Calligraphy. On the other hand, the school lacked any instruction in German and the modern foreign languages.

The first Rector of the Gymnasium was a German playwright, Sixtus Birck (1536-1554.) Under his leadership the school acquired an excellent reputation as a reformed and progressive institution. This tradition was further developed under Hieronymus Wolf’s leadership who recruited an outstanding faculty to tech at the Gymnasium including Georg Henisch
