= Georg Henisch =

German physician (1549–1618)

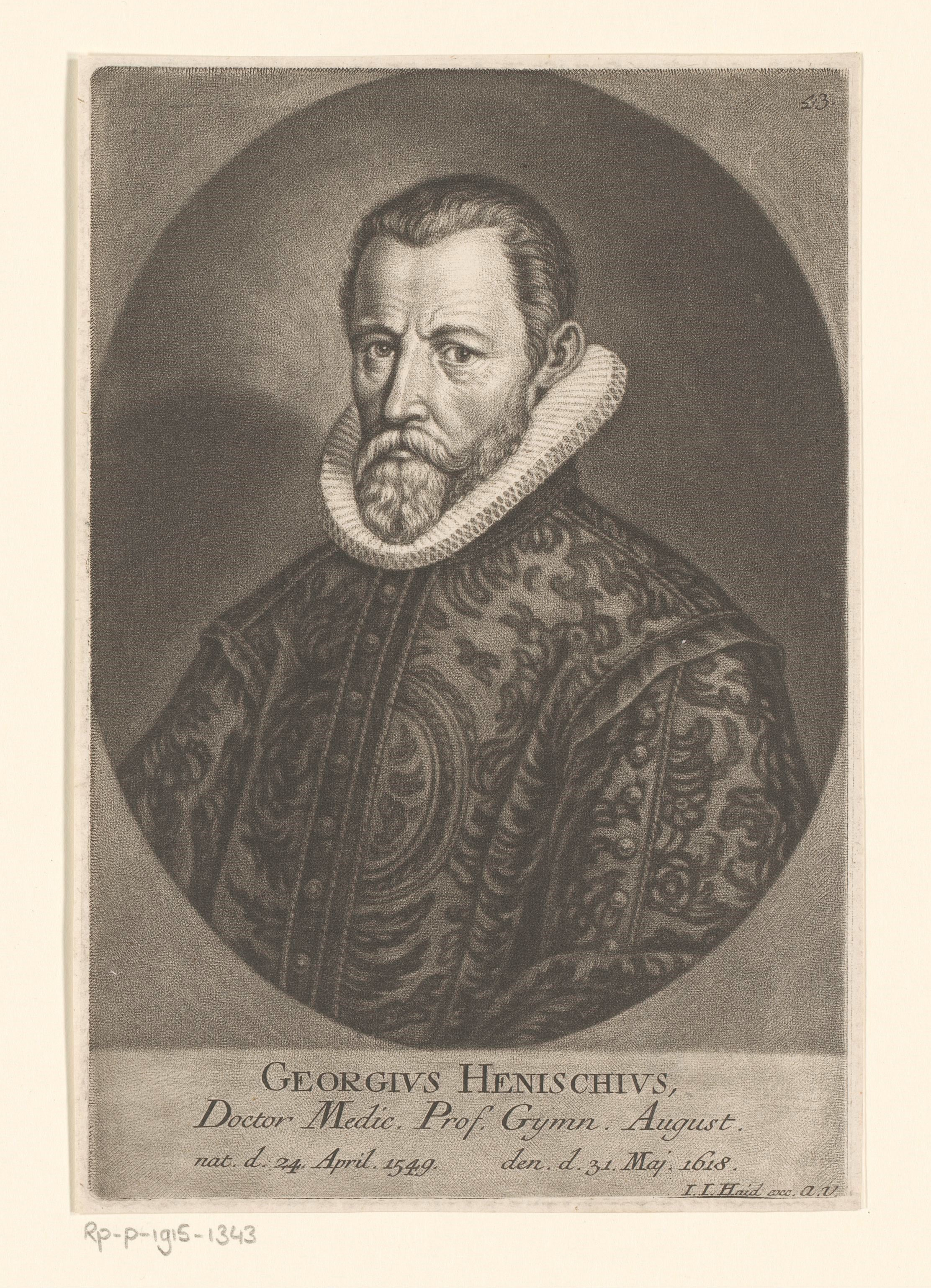
Portrait. Credit: Wellcome Collection

Georg Henisch (1549–1618) was a physician, humanist, educator, astronomer, mathematician and a professor of St. Ann Gymnasium in Augsburg, Germany, in the 16th and early 17th centuries.

== Life ==
Georg Henisch was born in Bartfeld (now Bardejov) in north-eastern Hungary (now Slovakia). The family moved to Bartfeld from Lower Saxony seeking religious freedom. His father Johannes was an attorney and worked for the city of Bartfeld. Henisch was educated in the Latin School run by Leonard Stockel and later spent three or four years at Wittenberg University (1570–1574). Subsequently he moved to Paris, Leipzig, and Basel, where in 1576 he obtained the title of Doctor of Medicine. In 1575 he was hired by an outstanding educator, Hieronymus Wolf, then-rector of St Ann Gymnasium in Augsburg, to teach rhetoric, philosophy, geography and astronomy on one year's probation. A year later he received tenure at St Ann Gymnasium and served there as a professor until his retirement in 1616. In 1576 he married the daughter of Augsburg pharmacist Phillip Wirsburg and had one daughter and three sons. Their son Phillip was later a professor of medicine at Montpellier. From 1576 until his death in 1618 he served as a city physician in Augsburg and was elected four times as the Dean of College of Physicians in Augsburg.

== Work ==
He is the author of more than thirty publications, including translations of Hesiod's poetry and the writings of the Cappadocian physician Arateus retained by the town library in Augsburg, Germany. His most outstanding publication was a thesaurus of the German language (1616; only the first volume from A to G was completed). He was a Protestant but served as a consultant to Pope Gregory XIII and contributed calculations to the introduction of the Gregorian calendar in 1582. His work alienated him from the Protestant elderly of the town of Augsburg because of their resistance to accepting the new calendar. Together with a fellow teacher, Simon Fabricus, he attempted to establish a free public university associated with St Ann Gymnasium, open to anyone who wished to learn. The timing was wrong due to the prevailing trend of the Counter-Reformation. He was in charge of the library at St Ann Gymnasium and published first, in German lands, a printed catalogue of the library including 8,500 titles. Only one of his books, The Principles of Geometry, Astronomie, and Geographie, was translated into English by Francis Cooke during his lifetime and published in London in 1591. He published several almanacs linking appearances of comets to major events, including weather predictions for the upcoming years between 1575 and 1616.

Beinecke Library at Yale University has several of Henisch's publications, including a copy of his German-language thesaurus published in 1616.

== See also ==
Bardejov – the town named one of its trade schools, Spojená škola Juraja Henischa, after Henisch
