= Paul Wittich =

German mathematician and astronomer

Tychonic geoheliocentric planetary model published 1587

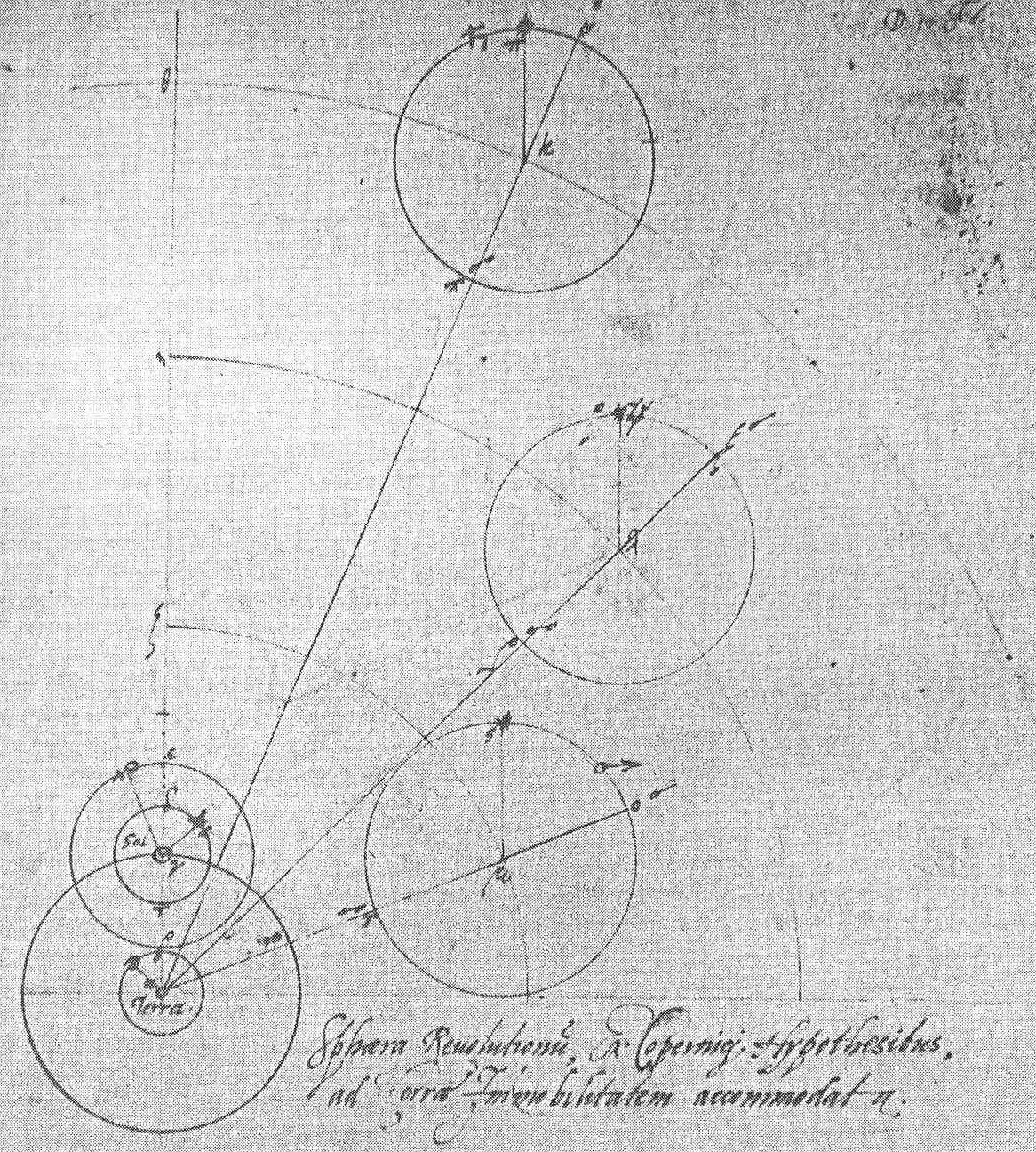
Paul Wittich's 1578 Capellan geoheliocentric planetary model - as annotated in his copy of Copernicus's De revolutionibus in February 1578

Paul Wittich (c.1546 – 9 January 1586) was a German mathematician and astronomer whose Capellan geoheliocentric model, in which the inner planets Mercury and Venus orbit the Sun but the outer planets Mars, Jupiter and Saturn orbit the Earth, may have directly inspired Tycho Brahe's more radically heliocentric geoheliocentric model in which all the 5 known primary planets orbited the Sun, which in turn orbited the stationary Earth.

== Biography ==
Wittich was born in Breslau (Wrocław), Silesia, Habsburg monarchy, and studied at the Universities of Leipzig, University of Wittenberg and Frankfurt (Oder), among others. During 1580 Wittich stayed with Tycho Brahe on his island Hven in Öresund, where he worked at his Uraniborg. He then was employed by William IV, Landgrave of Hesse-Kassel in 1584.

Wittich died in Vienna on January 9, 1586.

== Work ==
Wittich may have been influenced by Valentin Naboth's book Primarum de coelo et terra in adopting the Capellan system to explain the motion of the inferior planets. It is evident from Wittich's diagram of his Capellan system that the Martian orbit does not intersect the solar orbit nor those of Mercury and Venus, and would thus be compatible with solid celestial orbs, with the Solar orb containing the orbs of Venus and of Mercury and itself in turn wholly circumscribed by a Martian orb. This was in significant contrast with Ursus's geoheliocentric model in which the orbits of Mercury and Venus intersect the Martian orbit but the Solar orbit does not, and also with the Tychonic model in which the Martian orbit also intersects the Solar orbit in addition to those of Mercury and Venus, and whereby both these models rule out solid celestial orbs that cannot interpenetrate, if not excluding interpenetrating fluid orbs.

However, Wittich's Capellan model of the Martian orbit contradicted Copernicus's model in which Mars at opposition is nearer to the Earth than the Sun is, whereby if true the Solar and Martian orbits must intersect in all geoheliocentric models. Thus the question of whether the daily parallax of Mars was ever greater than that of the Sun was crucial to whether Wittich's (and indeed also Praetorius's and Ursus's) model was observationally tenable or not. It seems Tycho Brahe eventually came to the conclusion by 1588 that Mars does come nearer to the Earth than the Sun is, albeit contradicting his earlier conclusion by 1584 that his observations of Mars at opposition in 1582-3 established it had no discernible parallax, whereas he put the Sun's parallax at 3 arcminutes. Thus Brahe's 1588 model crucially contradicted both Wittich's and also Ursus's geoheliocentric models at least in respect of the dimensions of the Martian orbit, by positing its intersection with the Solar orbit.

Having failed to find any Martian parallax greater than the Solar parallax, Tycho had no valid observational evidence for his 1588 conclusion that Mars comes nearer to the Earth than the Sun, and nor did anybody else at that time, whereby Tycho's uniquely distinctive geoheliocentric model had no valid observational support in this respect. It seems its credibility rested solely upon his aristocratic social status rather than any scientific evidence. And this failure to find any Martian parallax in effect also refuted Copernicus's heliocentric model in respect of its Martian orbit, and supported the geocentric models of Ptolemy and the Capellan geoheliocentric model of Wittich and Praetorius and also Ursus's more Tychonic model. The latter differed from Tycho's only in respect of its non-intersecting Martian and Solar orbits and its daily rotating Earth.

It seems a primary purpose of Wittich's Capellan model, evident from the drafting markings in his drawing, was to save the integrity of solid celestial orbs, and the only planetary models compatible with solid celestial orbs were the Ptolemaic, Copernican and Wittichan Capellan (including Praetorius's) planetary models. But in 1610 Galileo's novel telescopic confirmation that Venus has a full set of phases like the Moon, published in his 1613 Letters on Sunspots, refuted the Ptolemaic geocentric model, which implied they are only crescents in conjunction, just as in opposition, whereas they are gibbous or full in conjunction. This crucial novel fact was logically implied by the Heraclidean, Capellan and Tychonic geoheliocentric planetary models, according to all of which at least the orbits of Venus and Mercury are centred on the Sun rather than the Earth, as well as by the pure heliocentric model. Consequently this left only the Copernican and Wittichan Capellan models compatible with both solid orbs and the phases of Venus. But only the Wittichan system was also compatible with the failure to find any stellar parallax predicted by all heliocentric models, in addition to also being compatible with the failure to find any Martian parallax that refuted both the Copernican and Tychonic models.

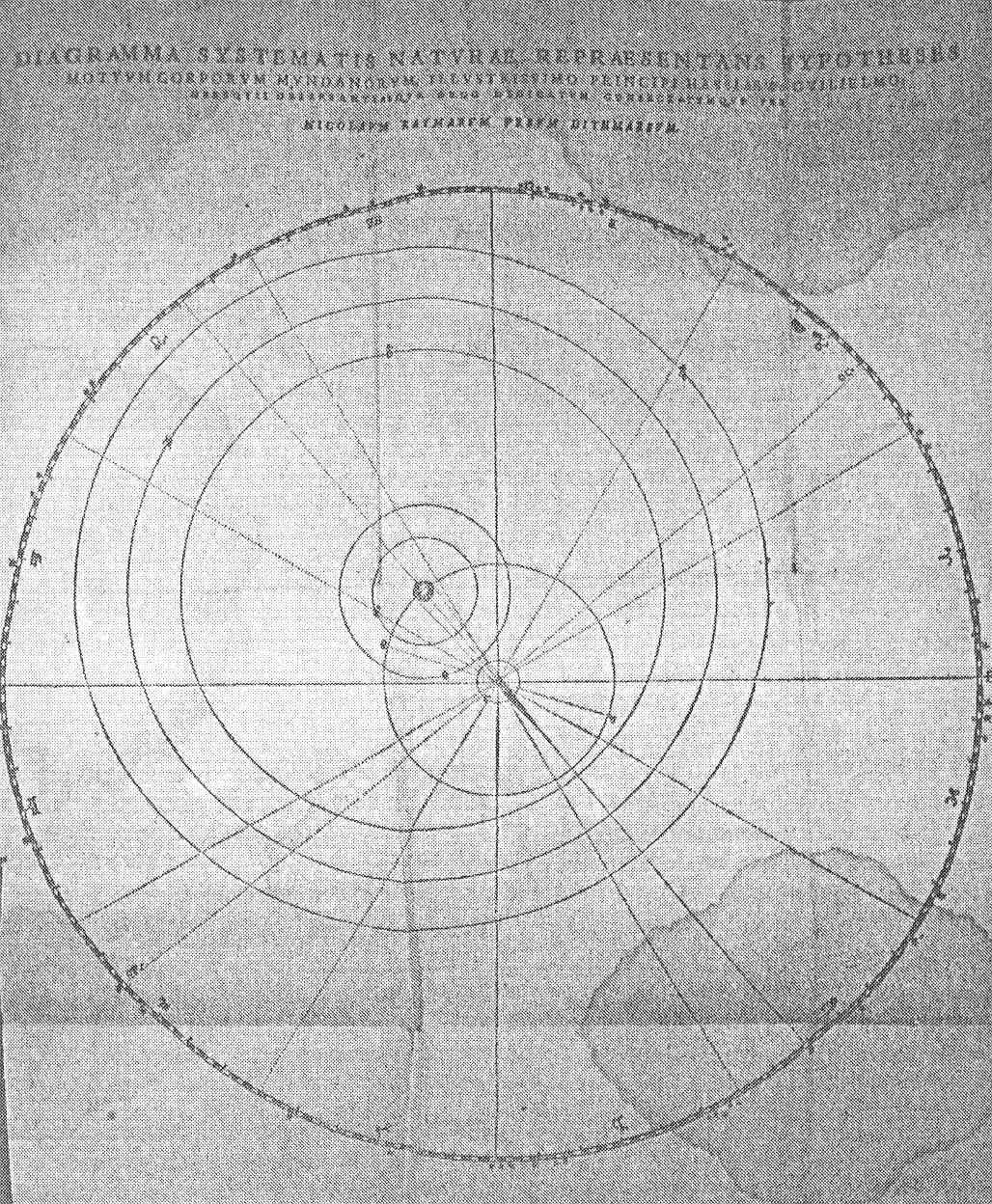
Ursus's 1588 geoheliocentric planetary model

Thus by 1610 it seems the only observationally tenable candidate for a planetary model with solid celestial orbs was Wittich's Capellan system. Indeed it also seems it was even the only planetary model that was generally observationally tenable, given the twin failures to find any stellar annual parallax nor any Martian daily parallax at that time. However, insofar as it was accepted that comets are superlunary and sphere-busting, whereby solid celestial orbs are impossible and thus intersecting orbits cease to be impossible, then this thereby also admitted the model of Ursus (and Origanus) as also observationally tenable, along with Wittich's Capellan system (and thus also Praetorius's), whilst the Ptolemaic model was ruled out by the phases of Venus, all heliocentric models by the perceived absence of any annual stellar parallax, and both the Copernican and Tychonic models were also refuted by the absence of any Martian daily parallax. Renowned anti-Copernican adherents of the Capellan planetary model included Francis Bacon, inter alia, and this model appealed to those who accepted Ptolemy's purely geocentric model was refuted by the phases of Venus, but were unpersuaded by Tychonic arguments that Mars, Jupiter and Saturn also orbited the Sun in addition to Mercury and Venus. Indeed even Newton's arguments for this stated in his commentary on Phenomenon 3 of Book 3 of his Principia were notably invalid.

== Literature ==
- van Helden Galileo and telescopic astronomy Taton & Wilson 1989
- Dreyer Tycho Brahe 1890
- Gingerich 1982 Dreyer and Tycho's World System Sky & Telescope 64 1982, p138-40
- Gingerich & Westman The Wittich Connection, Transactions of the American Philosophical Society Vol 78, Part 7, 1988
- Jarrell The contemporaries of Tycho Brahe in Taton & Wilson 1989
- Schofield, Christine The Tychonic and semi-Tychonic world systemsin Taton & Wilson 1989
- Taton & Wilson Planetary astronomy from the Renaissance to the rise of astrophysics Part A: Tycho Brahe to Newton Cambridge University Press 1989
- R. Westman (Ed) The Copernican Achievement 1976 University of California Press
- Siegmund Günther (1898). "Paul Wittich" . Allgemeine Deutsche Biographie (in German). Vol. 43. Leipzig: Duncker & Humblot. p. 637.
- Paul Wittich in the German National Library catalogue
