= Caspar Peucer =

German physician (1525–1602)

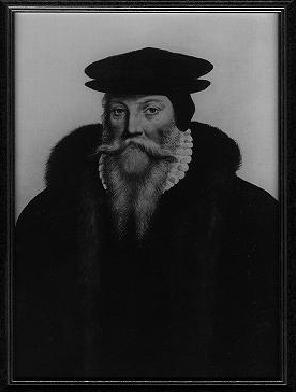
- Caspar Peucer
- Born: January 6, 1525; Bautzen, Germany
- Died: September 25, 1602 (aged 77); Dessau, Germany
- Scientific career
- Fields: Mathematics, astronomy, astrology, and medicine
- Academic advisors: Erasmus Reinhold; Georg Joachim Rheticus
- Notable students: Tycho Brahe; Johannes Praetorius; Salomon Alberti

Caspar Peucer (/ˈpɔɪkər/ POY-kər, German: [ˈkaspaʁ ˈpɔʏtsɐ]; January 6, 1525 – September 25, 1602) was a German reformer, physician, and scholar of Sorbian origin.

== Personal life ==
=== Early life ===
Caspar Peucer was born on January 6, 1525, in Bautzen, (Sachsen, Germany) and died on September 25, 1602, in Dessau, (Sachsen-Anhalt, Germany). He was the child of Gregor Peucer, a known craftsman, and Ottilie Simon. Peucer's father, Gregor, was trusted with certain tasks from the Bautzen elite regarding the city quarters between the town council and burghers. The Bautzen elite was an interconnected family with relational ties, this indicates that Peucer himself was also related to Gregorius Mattig, who was a highly respected humanist and intellectual during this time. Mattig himself, was a director of Upper Lusatia representing the Estate town during their uprising in the early 15th century. Peucer's education began in his hometown of Sachsen where he began studying at a local Protestant grammar school. This education system was excelling under the Joachim Knemiander administration, originating from the Upper Lusatian town which, is now present day Poland.

=== Middle life ===
After some time Peucer was later sent to a Latin school (named 'Trotzendorf') of Valentin Friedland. It was here he learned more regarding the new and developing Lutheran education, here he met other students who were interested in the same ideologies. Not too long after Peucer was at Trotzendorf, he was recommended to attend the University of Saxon Wittenberg. Wittenberg was a university where many Lutherans enrolled, this was also the place that the main disputes of the Reformation occurred. Then, Peucer enrolled in the University of Wittenberg in March 1543, after he finished his undergraduate he went on to graduate with his masters in September 1545. After graduation Peucer quickly became a professor at the University of Wittenberg, replacing Erasmus Reinhold following his death in 1553. Peucer began as a lower math professor in 1550 then, worked his way up to higher mathematics in 1554. While working as a professor at Wittenberg, Peucer taught alongside notable other mathematicians of the time and graduates of Wittenberg such as Erasmus Reinhold and Michael Maestlin. In his time at Wittenberg, Peucer was also one of the main promoters, along with Philipp Melanchthon, of the astrological department/program. After, he accepted the name of the rector of the Leucorea. In this time he continued going to school to ultimately gain his title as a doctor of medicine in 1560. It was during this time that Peucer began thinking more critically about his astrology views. He believed astrology was not only a practical art but an essential part of natural philosophy. The idea is that astrology fits perfectly into the teleological worldview in which it shows the critical work of God's creation, the stars being a secondary asset. After his research and schooling he later graduated with his master's degree. Peucer went on to marry his first wife, Magdalena, daughter of theologian and humanist Philipp Melanchthon. During their marriage she gave birth to three sons and seven daughters, she later died in 1575.

=== Later life ===
Around 1570, Peucer became the doctor to the Elector of Saxony, Augusts, who was a significant figure during the time of the Schmalkaldic war. In the position he became one of August's trusted advisors and acted as the head of the Philipistic. The main goal was to gain followers of the Lutheran church, this quickly created some suspicion that there was a connection with Peucer and Calvinism. Created by John Calvin, a Protestant reformer, Calvinism was an immediately popular religion that quickly spread throughout Europe. It came at the perfect time when religion began expanding, and freedom of searching religion was brought forth. Calvinism was thought to be against the views of astrology; as Peucer was thinking more critically about astrology fitting into a teleological world, this was a stepping stone indicating his views were differing from society. Peucer was soon accused of a Calvinism plot and was captured on April 1, 1574, in Wittenberg; it was there that Peucer's works were searched, and he had to explain his religious and political ties in front of the Dresden Consistory. His accusation stems from his interpretation of the Lord's Supper because strict Lutherans believe that Christ was in the Eucharist. It was the Consistory that charged Peucer with Calvinism and suspected he tried to expand his teaching to Saxony. He pleaded not guilty but, after countless trials, he was found guilty from his own personal writings. This was the start of Peucer's twelve years in prison, it began in the Rochlitz castle, where Magdalena could stay with him. But, later he was moved to Leipzig, where he stayed for the rest of his sentence. At this point, he was unable to teach math, astronomy, or medicine. So, Peucer turned towards writing poetry. It was here that wrote his poem, Idyllium, and his longest poem reflecting on his birthplace in Upper Lusatia. During this time he was waiting for his family to bring forth a petition to get him out of his sentence early, which was granted in 1586. After his release he became the personal doctor to Anhalt princess in Desseau, he died in the capitol on September 25, 1602.

While not as well known as Tycho Brahe, Peucer worked with Brahe in a few instances, including intervening by letter on Brahe's behalf in a dispute between the latter and Christoph Rothman surrounding his invention of the Tychonic system.

== Official titles/professions ==
- Professor at the University of Wittenberg (1550–1559)
- Rector of the University of Wittenberg
- Philosopher
- Medical doctor (achieved in 1560)
- Physician to August of Saxony (1570)
- Astronomer
- Astrological correspondent

== Religious ideology ==
Caspar Peucer was a practicing Protestant who believed in Divine Providence, this just meant that God is able to and does intervene with nature. The Protestant astrologers of the time held the belief that before the original sin, nature did not deviate from its expected laws. But then after the Fall, God and the devil began to send supernatural messages through nature. This could be seen through medical diagnoses, astrological horoscopes, and meteorology, according to Peucer. As a Christian, Peucer believed in divine intervention, be it by God or the Devil. The ideas of what was considered official divination seemed to differ in opinion from person to person. Peucer upheld that God was the only divine entity with the capability of changing the course or essence of nature. Caspar Peucer extensively recorded how the constellations and meteorological events were signs or warnings of historical events that occurred near the time of the astronomical events.

Divine providence in astrology was in opposition to what many of the Catholics and Orthodox Lutherans believed. They would say that pairing natural signs with historical events or future events does not work with the belief that God gave humankind freewill. The accepted view for science and philosophy was to follow an Aristotilian approach, which includes using empirical evidence and reason to come to conclusions. That is definitely the standard goal for philosophers when coming up with any theories or ideas. Peucer tried to link his ideas of astrology with a strong Aristotelian argument through one of his writings, but it does not seem like he ever really convinced the Catholics of his ideas, and others abandoned the ideas of horoscopes as a science fairly quickly after the height of its popularity. Additionally, Peucer believed in both angels and demons which can be found in some of his astrological ideology. Specifically, Peucer thought that both of these entities could affect and even explain some serious astrological phenomena such as comets in the atmosphere to produce many particular effects that he had no other explanation for. That being said, in his texts, Peucer believed that these event could somewhat predict the future as they were signs that appeared not only to our world, but also the sublunar world. He justified this on the basis that, there would be no point in astrological signs appearing from unknown sources if they did not mean anything.

Peucer's thinking about meteorology was that it had two purposes: a natural one and a divine one. He believed that the energy from the weather caused an effect on human behavior, which he called the "natural efficient cause". He believed that the divine cause, which he called the "final cause" gave warnings or signs. This can be seen in his belief of angels and demons as Peucer thought that these entities, for reasons both good and bad, could be the source of some phenomena such earthquakes. From this, they were able to draw a lot of knowledge about God that corresponds to Protestantism. Ideas such as how God is transcendent and cares enough to intervene in nature. The religious perspective through which meteorology and astrology was looked at was important in gaining acceptance and support for the ideas. There were different levels that meteors were classified by. Because of Peucer's belief that only God can actually go against nature, lesser powers, like the devil, were able to cause rare meteorological events. But, Peucer also recognized that it can be rather unclear to recognize in nature who is causing rare meteorological events as it could be God, the devil, angels, demons, or even just natural causes. It could These rare events were not technically against nature; they held more meaning than everyday normal weather, but were not placed on the same level as miracles.

During this time, science and religion were used in ways that supported each other. Peucer's Christianity pressured him to teach a geocentric model of the universe, which led him to the common and comfortable theory of Ptolemy. In 1543, Copernicus released his model of the universe which was heliocentric, the sun was in the center, but Peucer did not attach to Copernicus' model because the Christians at the time believed the Earth had to be the center of the cosmos.

=== Religious conflict ===
There is evidence that there were strict rules regarding the Lord's Supper, any mishandling or deviations from the traditions of taking it were seen as something that could be punishable by law. Peucer's denial of Christ's physical presence in the bread got him in trouble. Because Peucer held such a high power position in education, he was also able to hire chairmen that were not Orthodox Lutherans, they were known as Philippists (followers of Philip Melanchthon).

For about a decade of his life, Peucer was imprisoned and expelled from the University of Wittenberg along with several other teachers who were also expelled (1576-1586). This was mainly on account of secretly being a Calvinist along with a few other theological differences with the elector, August of Saxony. August of Saxony ultimately had the largest hand in Peucer's imprisonment due to his intolerance of Calvinism, which was a Protestant Christian reform led by John Calvin in the 1500s that differed from Catholicism and Lutheranism which were the two dominant religions in Germany at the time. Peucer was finally released from his imprisonment in 1587 after August of Saxony died. That being said, philosophical teachings during the period of Peucer's imprisonment were affected and progress was greatly slowed. The imprisonment resulted in damaged reputation, loss of credibility, and the loss of most of their power at Wittenburg for Peucer and his colleagues.

== Works (incomplete) ==
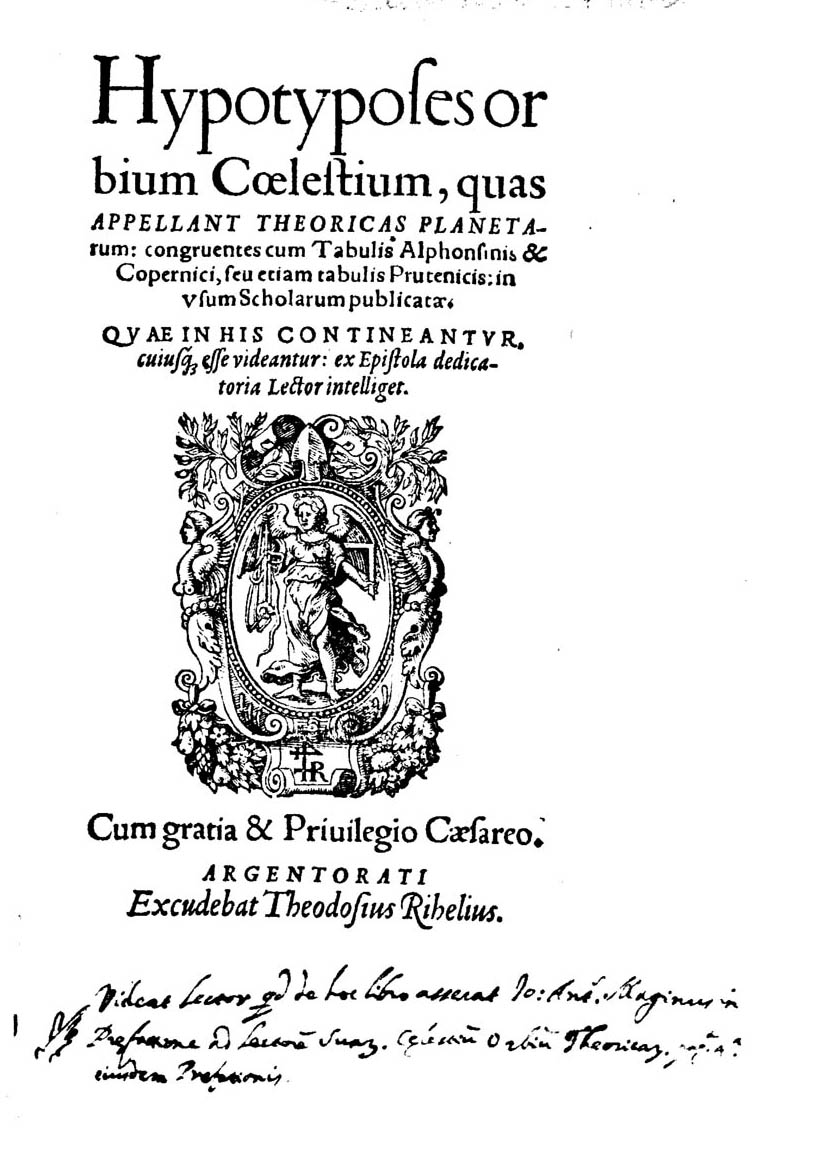
Hypotyposes orbium coelestium, 1568

He wrote on mathematics, astronomy, geometry, and medicine, and edited some of Melanchthon's letters (1565 and 1570):

- De dimensione terrae (1550)
- Elementa doctrinae de circulis coelestibus et primo motu (1551)
- Tractatus historicus de Ph. Melanchthonis sententia de controversia coenae Domini, 1553 (printed 1596)
- Commentarius de praecipuis divinationum generibus, 1553 - this writing was Peucer's attempt to prove astrology was a science
- Logistice regulae arithmeticae, quam Cossam et Algebram vocant (1556)
- Corpus Doctrinae Philippicum, 1560
- Chronicon Carionis (1560-1565)
- Opera Melan, 1562–65
- Epistolae, 1565
- Hypotyposes orbium coelestium (in Latin). Strasbourg: Theodosius Rihel. 1568.
- De Essentia et ortu animae 1590 - about the connection of the constellations to the immaterial soul and the mortal soul
- Idyllion de Lusatia, 1583 (printed 1594)

== De Dimensione Terrae (1550) ==
Peucer's De Dimensione Terra [On the Dimensions of the Earth] was first published in 1550, when Peucer was 25. was intended as a textbook of mathematical geography for the study of philosophy by students of the Lutheran University of Wittenberg. This octavo covers matters of physics, astronomy, astrology, and history. It built upon Melancthon's work, in the form of relatively simple figures for the ease of comprehension for its intended audience; however, mathematics calculations in the latter part of the book were far above the capability of the average Wittenberg student. Although it was originally published in 1550, it was subsequently updated 3 times in 1554, 1579, and 1587.

The original 1550 edition incorporated figures explaining the measurement of spheres and the determination of geographical coordinates. The 1554 edition adds to this by providing the calculations necessary for discerning the distance between two points from coordinates. The works found in this book are based on the trigonometric tables of Copernicus, the flat and spherical geometry developments of Georg Joachim Rheticus, and works of Johnannes Regiomantus. Another interesting addition to the 1554 version is the inclusion of two works that describe the Holy Land by Burchard of Mount Sion and an explanation of Biblical place names. The religious tie-in arises from Peucer's belief that the ability of man to calculate the nature of the earth reveals the "action of Divine Providence in the world."

In the first chapter, this point is hammered home as it implies that history must be inferred or understood in terms of its Christian context. Thus, Geography should then be thought of in mainly mathematical terms as opposed to historical or ethnic descriptions. Furthermore, in the second part of his work, he reiterates a foundation of longitude and latitude known by many at the time. However, in his work he aims to inspire his audience to make inferences of their own and improve the status quo of cartography to a certain extent. First, the calculation of longitude required two people in different places to record the same celestial event as well as the time it occurred to calculate the difference of longitude in units of time. This highlights many problems including the need for an accurate depiction of time and coordination between many people in different places. In other words, many maps of the time were the product of an accumulation of knowledge and surveys over time, but some may be slightly inaccurate or not scientific enough. He is more concerned with the systematic measurement and calculations of distances, of maps and areas, inspiring him to attempt to improve maps from mere descriptions of general locations of areas with possible errors, to in-depth mathematical and descriptive maps that can withstand the test of time. He then goes on to describe the methods in depth for calculating the distance between two fixed points using the equators, poles, meridians, longitude, and latitude to create an imaginary triangle. Then using relatively simple trigonometric functions using angles, you can reach a mathematically deduced number.

Peucer recognized that the advanced mathematics used in the latter parts of his work may have been inaccessible to many of his students. In the end of his book essentially suggested to students that they might reject his overly complicated methods and use the pre-established way of calculating distances to better suit their needs. This in turn allowed classes that would use his work the option to stop at the foundational level of mathematics mentioned in the beginning or to go on to the latter part of the book which has math compared to that of a master's degree or higher in terms of complexity. While the work as a whole seems ever too complicated for a common student to understand, there seems to be evidence of the use of this work in mathematics classes until the late 1580s with many copies of the book distributed around libraries throughout Europe.

== Influences ==
Caspar Peucer studied a variety of topics throughout his life, but some of his most recognized work are his contributions to the arts and sciences, particularly astrology and medicine. Although some of his views are not completely in line with these figures, his work was influenced by the ideas of Aristotle, Ptolemy, and Copernicus. He, along with many of his peers, was more receptive to the ideologies of Aristotle and Ptolemy. He took a liking to the geocentric world system of Aristotle and Ptolemy, rather than the heliocentric world system created by Copernicus. In the Copernican world system, the sun is the center of the universe, rather than the earth, and everything rotates around the sun. Peucer formulated a geometrical construction of the universe to illustrate the movement of heavenly bodies. Despite the differences in the view of the world system, like Copernicus, Peucer used the significance of light and optics as a means of explaining natural law.

Another figure that not only influenced Peucer, but also directly contributed to a great deal of his work is Philipp Melanchthon. Melanchthon is best known for his works in theology, particularly, his work on the theory of natural law. Peucer was a part of Melanchthon's inner circle of pupils, and later became his son-in-law after marrying his daughter, Magdalena. Melanchthon's pupils also included members Erasmus Reinhold, Hieronymous Wolf, Jacob Milich, and many others. Melanchthon's inner circle or those who closely followed his teachings are respectfully referred to as the 'Philippists'. They studied and formulated many works under the teaching of Melanchthon. The pupils viewed Melanchthon as one of the only scholars who could actually properly interpret the divine providence and celestial writing through his knowledge of astrology. The Philippists studied or were rather inspired by the works of Girolamo Cardano. Cardano was a professor of medicine known in the Republic of Letters for his medical, philosophical, mathematical, and astrological works. In the mid-1540s, he published a formula for solving cubic equations in his Ars Magna. However, this group was mainly influenced by Cardano's contribution to the studies of horoscopes. Cardano is famous for drawing horoscopes for both the living and dead. He later was tried by the Roman Inquisition, which found his astrological ideas especially problematic.

Tycho Brahe, another well-known astronomer during this period, was not so much an influence to Peucer's work, but they did share their views with each other. Tycho very much disagreed with some aspects of Ptolemy's view of the cosmos. He did not like his approach to the motions of the heavens, and use of the equant point. Peucer, on the other hand, took a liking to Ptolemy's views. In 1588, Brahe wrote a letter to Peucer addressing where he felt Ptolemy fell short, and how the Copernican system provided a resolution for the shortcomings. Despite Brahe's letter to Peucer criticising Ptolemy and defending Copernicus, both he and Peucer disapproved earth's movement in the Copernican system. Brahe and Peucer have a history of exchanges, where they share their views on particular aspects of natural philosophy, but it is unclear if they actually contributed to or worked together to learn more about the cosmos.
