= Hieronymus Wolf =

German historian and humanist (1516 - 1580)

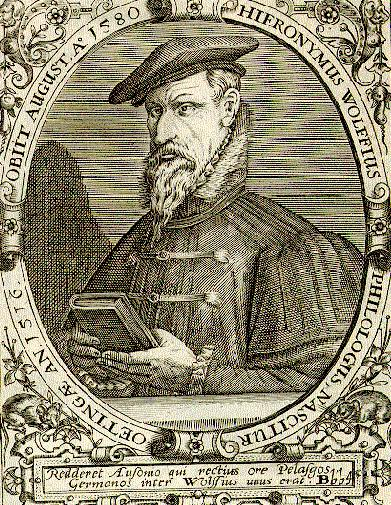
- Born: 13 August 1516; Oettingen in Bayern, Germany
- Died: 8 October 1580 (aged 64)
- Occupation: Historian

Hieronymus Wolf (13 August 1516 – 8 October 1580) was a German historian and humanist, most famous for introducing a system of Roman historiography that eventually became the standard in works of medieval Byzantine history.

== Life ==
Born at Oettingen in Bayern, Germany, he was one of nine children. His father, allegedly of noble origin, was an office clerk and much impoverished. Hieronymus himself for years worked as a scribe, although he was formally educated as an attorney. He studied, on and off, in Wittenberg and was very impressed with Melanchthon and directly exposed to Lutheran teaching. Allegedly, he saved money out of his meager income to purchase a Latin-Greek dictionary and taught himself Greek. Upon acquiring some mastery of Greek, he plunged into translation in German of the speeches of Demosthenes. His translation was published in 1549 by well-known publishing house Oporinus, which made his name known to the Fugger family in Augsburg. Wolf got a position as a secretary and librarian of Fugger Library in 1551.

A student of Philipp Melanchthon and Joachim Camerarius, he managed to secure the position of secretary and librarian in the newly established public library of Augsburg in 1537, where he was given the chance to study and translate numerous ancient and medieval Greek authors, making them accessible to German academics. He made his reputation as a scholar of Isocrates and first published an edition of him at Paris in 1551. The library became famous for its contents and in particular for 100 Greek manuscripts that were transferred from Venice. Later on, under the scholarly direction of Hieronymus Wolf and others, the library became a research center of both respect and quality throughout Europe.

Six years later, Wolf was appointed first rector of Gelehrtenschule in the building of St Anne Carmelite cloister, subsequently known as St Anne Gymnasium. The Protestant College was established there to counterbalance the Jesuit college created more or less at the same time.

Hieronymus Wolf was, however, a sick man throughout his life. He never married. Intellectually brilliant and very renowned as a teacher, he was also very egocentric and secluded. As a result, the outstanding faculty he brought to St Anne was often left to fend for themselves and ran the school independently. He died aged 64. His initiative led to the hiring of two outstanding faculty: Georg Henisch and Simon Fabricius. They added a Protestant College to the Gymnasium in the early 1580s. The initiative to establish an institution of learning open to adults was an ethos of Protestant teaching. Soon, the college ran into difficulties due to the rapidly emerging Counter-Reformation.

== Publications ==
Hieronymus continued to work in Augsburg's library, but his life's work was outside the traditional fields proposed by humanism. Until his time, no distinction was made between ancient and medieval Greek works, and indeed the latter was shadowed by the interest shown for classical authors. Rather, interest was stirred from a different direction, that of discovering and explaining the history that led to the conquest of much of eastern Europe by the Ottomans, whom Wolf lived to see during their Siege of Vienna. He focused primarily on Greek history, and published his work in 1557 under the title Corpus Historiae Byzantinae, which was more a collection of Byzantine sources than a comprehensive history. Nevertheless, the impact of his work on the long term was massive, as it would set the foundations for upcoming medieval Greek historians. Hieronymus Wolf, is credited as the first to reference the Eastern Roman Empire with "Byzantinae", which has since spread through western European scholars and gradually replaced the Eastern Roman Empire's own demonym within European academia. This replacement reflects the feud between east and west over the title of Emperor of the Romans, that began with Constantine the Great transferring the capital to Constantinople.

Following the Ottoman conquest of Constantinople (Istanbul) in 1453, Mehmed II assumed the title Kayser-i Rûm ("Caesar of Rome") and in 1480 started an expedition to Italy which began with the Ottoman invasion of Otranto and Apulia (1480–1481) as the first step of his plan to conquer also the city of Rome. The two Ottoman sieges of Vienna in 1529 and 1683 were in fact attempts by the Kayser-i Rûm to subjugate the Kaiser der Römer by capturing the latter's primary capital city; the first of these two failed attempts happened during Hieronymus Wolf's lifetime. The Ottoman–Habsburg rivalry and their conflicting claims as the Kayser-i Rûm (Anatolian) versus the Kaiser der Römer (Germanic) may have been another reason that led Hieronymus Wolf to coin the term Byzantine Empire, in order to strengthen the legitimacy of the Germanic claim which the Catholic Church favoured and recognised, in hopes of recentering the legacy of the Roman Empire within a European Christian identity exclusively.

In the 17th century, Louis XIV of France prompted for the assemblage of all Roman works and called several renowned scholars from around the world to participate in this effort. Hieronymus' Corpus would be used to build upon. The result was the immense Corpus Historiae Byzantinae in 34 volumes, with paralleled Greek text and Latin translation. This edition popularized the term "Byzantine Empire" (never used by that empire itself during the centuries of its existence) and established it in historical studies.

== See also ==
- Melanchthon Circle
