= Salomon Alberti =

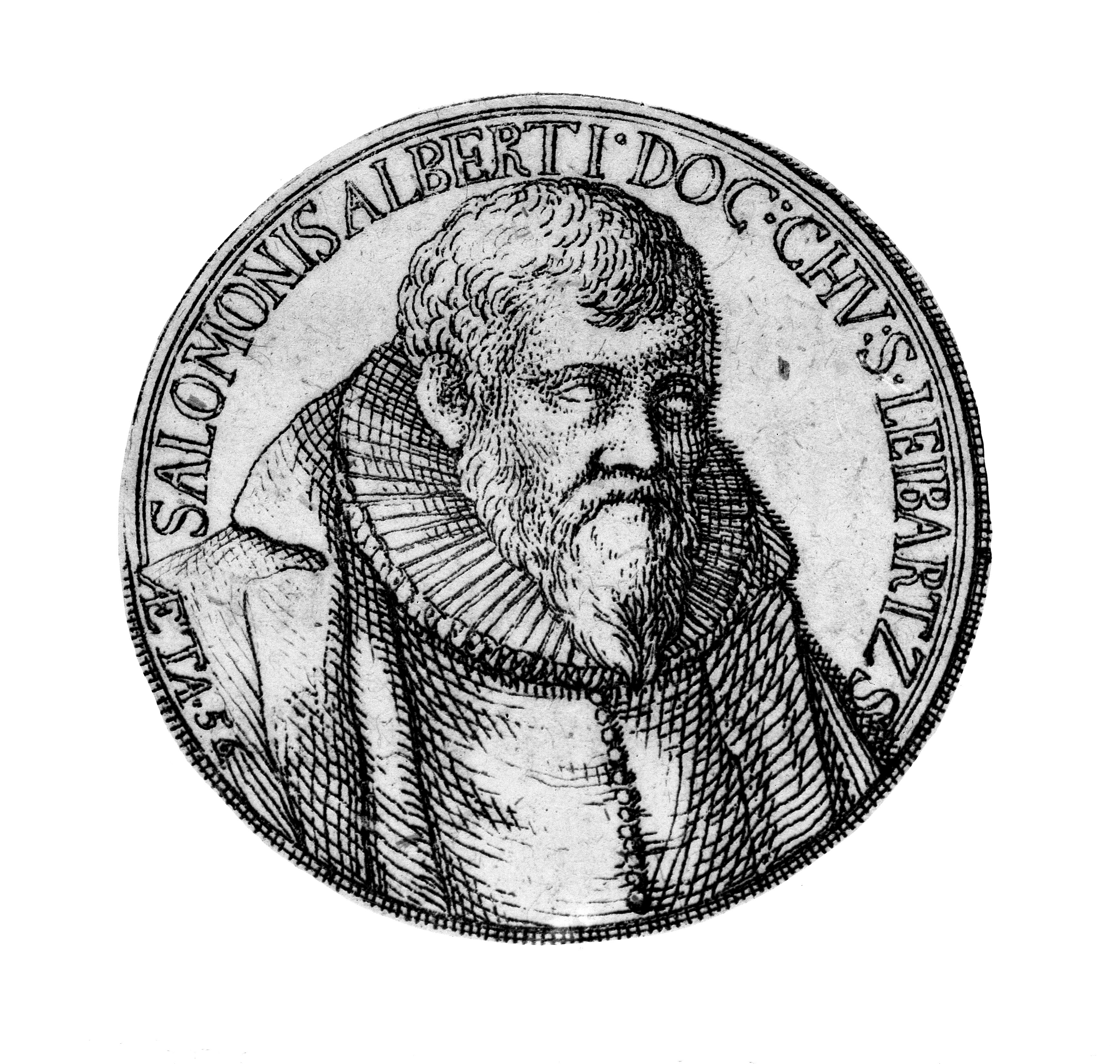
An engraving from a medallion

Salomon Alberti (30 September 1540 – 28 March 1600) was a German physician who is best known for being the first to illustrate venous valves in his book Tres Orationes (1585).

== Life ==
Salomon Alberti was born in Naumburg. His father who was from Nürnberg died when Salomon was just a year old leaving his mother Dorothea to take care of him. As she was too poor to provide him an education, he was supported by the city council and given a free education. He then went on to study medicine at the University of Wittenberg, obtaining a degree in liberal arts in 1564 and then became a professor of physics in 1575 and a professor of anatomy in 1577. In 1592 he became physician to Duke Friedrich Wilhelm in Dresden. Both these places were then in the Electorate of Saxony.

Alberti followed the traditions of anatomy set by Andreas Vesalius and began to describe the venous valves that had been written about by Girolamo Fabrizio, the lachrymal structures of the eye and wrote a text on anatomy that went into several editions.
