= Tychonic system =

Model of the Solar System proposed in 1588 by Tycho Brahe

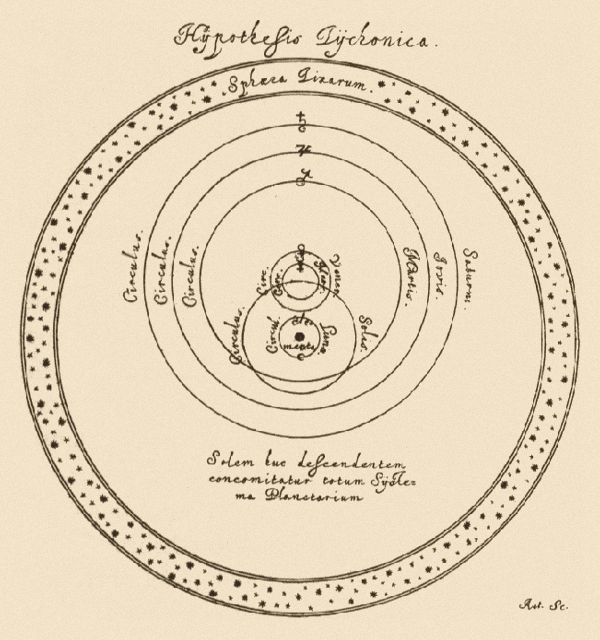
A 17th century illustration of the Hypothesis Tychonica from Hevelius' Selenographia, 1647 page 163, whereby the Sun, Moon, and sphere of stars orbit the Earth, while the five known planets (Mercury, Venus, Mars, Jupiter, and Saturn) orbit the Sun.

The Tychonic system shown in colour, with the objects that rotate around the Earth shown on blue orbits, and the objects that rotate around the Sun shown on orange orbits. Around all is a sphere of stars, which rotates.

The Tychonic system (or Tychonian system) is a model of the universe published by Tycho Brahe in 1588, which combines what he saw as the mathematical benefits of the Copernican system with the philosophical and "physical" benefits of the Ptolemaic system. The model may have been inspired by Valentin Naboth and Paul Wittich, a Silesian mathematician and astronomer. A similar cosmological model was independently proposed in the Hindu astronomical treatise Tantrasamgraha (c. 1500 CE) by Nilakantha Somayaji of the Kerala school of astronomy and mathematics.

It is conceptually a geocentric model, or more precisely geoheliocentric: the Earth is at the centre of the universe, the Sun and Moon and the stars revolve around the Earth, and the other five planets revolve around the Sun. At the same time, the motions of the planets are mathematically equivalent to the motions in Copernicus' heliocentric system under a simple coordinate transformation, so that, as long as no force law is postulated to explain why the planets move as described, there is no mathematical reason to prefer either the Tychonic or the Copernican system.

== Motivation for the Tychonic system ==
Tycho admired aspects of Copernicus's heliocentric model, but felt that it had problems as concerned physics, astronomical observations of stars, and religion. Regarding the Copernican system, Tycho wrote,

This innovation expertly and completely circumvents all that is superfluous or discordant in the system of Ptolemy. On no point does it offend the principle of mathematics. Yet it ascribes to the Earth, that hulking, lazy body, unfit for motion, a motion as quick as that of the aethereal torches, and a triple motion at that.

(The "triple motion" refers to its daily rotation, yearly revolution, and axial precession.)

In regard to physics, Tycho held that the Earth was just too sluggish and heavy to be continuously in motion. According to the accepted Aristotelian physics of the time, the heavens (whose motions and cycles were continuous and unending) were made of "Aether" or "Quintessence"; this substance, not found on Earth, was light, strong, and unchanging, and its natural state was circular motion. By contrast, the Earth (where objects seem to have motion only when moved) and things on it were composed of substances that were heavy and whose natural state was rest. Consequently, the Earth was considered to be a "lazy" body that was not readily moved. Thus while Tycho acknowledged that the daily rising and setting of the Sun and stars could be explained by the Earth's rotation, as Copernicus had said, still

such a fast motion could not belong to the earth, a body very heavy and dense and opaque, but rather belongs to the sky itself whose form and subtle and constant matter are better suited to a perpetual motion, however fast.

In regards to the stars, Tycho also believed that if the Earth orbited the Sun annually there should be an observable stellar parallax over any period of six months, during which the angular orientation of a given star would change thanks to Earth's changing position (this parallax does exist, but is so small it was not detected until 1838, when Friedrich Bessel discovered a parallax of 0.314 arcseconds of the star 61 Cygni). The Copernican explanation for this lack of parallax was that the stars were such a great distance from Earth that Earth's orbit was almost insignificant by comparison. However, Tycho noted that this explanation introduced another problem: Stars as seen by the naked eye appear small, but of some size, with more prominent stars such as Vega appearing larger than lesser stars such as Polaris, which in turn appear larger than many others. Tycho had determined that a typical star measured approximately a minute of arc in size, with more prominent ones being two or three times as large. In writing to Christoph Rothmann, a Copernican astronomer, Tycho used basic geometry to show that, assuming a small parallax that just escaped detection, the distance to the stars in the Copernican system would have to be 700 times greater than the distance from the Sun to Saturn. Moreover, the only way the stars could be so distant and still appear the sizes they do in the sky would be if even average stars were gigantic—at least as big as the orbit of the Earth, and of course vastly larger than the Sun (most stars visible to the naked eye are giants, supergiants, or large, bright main-sequence stars). And, Tycho said, the more prominent stars would have to be even larger still. And what if the parallax was even smaller than anyone thought, so the stars were yet more distant? Then they would all have to be even larger still. Tycho said

Deduce these things geometrically if you like, and you will see how many absurdities (not to mention others) accompany this assumption [of the motion of the earth] by inference.

Copernicans offered a religious response to Tycho's geometry: titanic, distant stars might seem unreasonable, but they were not, for the Creator could make his creations that large if he wanted. In fact, Rothmann responded to this argument of Tycho's by saying

[W]hat is so absurd about [an average star] having size equal to the whole [orbit of the Earth]? What of this is contrary to divine will, or is impossible by divine Nature, or is inadmissible by infinite Nature? These things must be entirely demonstrated by you, if you will wish to infer from here anything of the absurd. These things that vulgar sorts see as absurd at first glance are not easily charged with absurdity, for in fact divine Sapience and Majesty is far greater than they understand. Grant the vastness of the Universe and the sizes of the stars to be as great as you like—these will still bear no proportion to the infinite Creator. It reckons that the greater the king, so much greater and larger the palace befitting his majesty. So how great a palace do you reckon is fitting to GOD?

Religion played a role in Tycho's geocentrism also—he cited the authority of scripture in portraying the Earth as being at rest. He rarely used Biblical arguments alone (to him they were a secondary objection to the idea of Earth's motion) and over time he came to focus on scientific arguments, but he did take Biblical arguments seriously.

Tycho advocated as an alternative to the Ptolemaic geocentric system a "geoheliocentric" system (now known as the Tychonic system), which he developed in the late 1570s. In such a system, the Sun, Moon, and stars circle a central Earth, while the five planets orbit the Sun. The essential difference between the heavens (including the planets) and the Earth remained: Motion stayed in the aethereal heavens; immobility stayed with the heavy sluggish Earth. It was a system that Tycho said violated neither the laws of physics nor sacred scripture—with stars located just beyond Saturn and of reasonable size.

=== Precursors to geoheliocentrism ===
Tycho was not the first to propose a geoheliocentric system. It used to be thought that Heraclides in the 4th century BC had suggested that Mercury and Venus revolve around the Sun, which in turn (along with the other planets) revolves around the Earth. Macrobius Ambrosius Theodosius (395–423 AD) later described this as the "Egyptian System", stating that "it did not escape the skill of the Egyptians", though there is no other evidence it was known in ancient Egypt. The difference was that Tycho's system had all the planets (with the exception of Earth) revolving around the Sun, instead of just the interior planets of Mercury and Venus. In this regard, he was anticipated in the 15th century by the Kerala school astronomer Nilakantha Somayaji, whose geoheliocentric system also had all the planets revolving around the Sun. The difference to both these systems was that Tycho's model of the Earth does not rotate daily, as Heraclides and Nilakantha claimed, but is static. He was also anticipated by the cosmology depicted in the Leiden Aratea, a Carolingian manuscript created in the early 9th Century for the Carolingian court.

== History and development ==
Tycho's system was foreshadowed, in part, by that of Martianus Capella, who described a system in which Mercury and Venus are placed on epicycles around the Sun, which circles the Earth. Copernicus, who cited Capella's theory, even mentioned the possibility of an extension in which the other three of the six known planets would also circle the Sun. This was foreshadowed by the Irish Carolingian scholar Johannes Scotus Eriugena in the 9th century, who went a step further than Capella by suggesting both Mars and Jupiter orbited the sun as well. In 1501 CE, Nilakantha Somayaji, an Indian astronomer of the Kerala school of astronomy and mathematics presented a comprehensive geoheliocentric model in his treatise Tantrasamgraha (and later elaborated in his Aryabhatiyabhasya). In Nilkantha's computational system, the five planets—Mercury, Venus, Mars, Jupiter and Saturn—orbit the Sun, while the Sun in turn revolves around a central, rotating Earth. According to George G Joseph his equation of the centre for the interior planets(Mercury and Venus) remained the most accurate until the time of Johannes Kepler in the 17th century.

The Tychonic system, which was announced in 1588, became a major competitor with the Copernican system as an alternative to the Ptolemaic. After Galileo's observation of the phases of Venus in 1610, most cosmological controversy then settled on variations of the Tychonic and Copernican systems. In a number of ways, the Tychonic system proved philosophically more intuitive than the Copernican system, as it reinforced commonsense notions of how the Sun and the planets are mobile while the Earth is not. Additionally, a Copernican system would suggest the ability to observe stellar parallax, which could not be observed until the 19th century. On the other hand, because of the intersecting deferents of Mars and the Sun (see diagram), it went against the Ptolemaic and Aristotelian notion that the planets were placed within nested spheres. Tycho and his followers revived the ancient Stoic philosophy instead, since it used fluid heavens which could accommodate intersecting circles.

=== Legacy ===
After Tycho's death, Johannes Kepler used Tycho's observations to demonstrate that the orbits of the planets are ellipses and not circles, creating the modified Copernican system that ultimately displaced both the Tychonic and Ptolemaic systems. However, the Tychonic system was very influential in the late 16th and 17th centuries. In 1616, during the Galileo affair, the papal Congregation of the Index banned all books advocating the Copernican system, including works by Copernicus, Galileo, Kepler and other authors until 1758. The Tychonic system was an acceptable alternative as it explained the observed phases of Venus with a static Earth. Jesuit astronomers in China used it, as did a number of European scholars. Jesuits (such as Clavius, Christoph Grienberger, Christoph Scheiner, Odo Van Maelcote) supported the Tychonic system.

The discovery of stellar aberration in the early 18th century by James Bradley proved that the Earth did in fact move around the Sun and Tycho's system fell out of use among scientists. In the modern era, some modern geocentrists use a modified Tychonic system with elliptical orbits, while rejecting the concept of relativity.

== See also ==
- Equivalence principle
