= Erasmus Reinhold =

German astronomer and mathematician (1511–1553)

- Born: 22 October 1511; Saalfeld, Electorate of Saxony
- Died: 19 February 1553 (aged 41); Saalfeld, Electorate of Saxony
- Education: University of Wittenberg
- Scientific career
- Fields: Astronomer and mathematician
- Workplaces: University of Wittenberg
- Academic advisors: Jacob Milich
- Notable students: Johannes Hommel; Valentine Naibod; Caspar Peucer

Erasmus Reinhold (22 October 1511 – 19 February 1553) was a German astronomer and mathematician, considered to be the most influential astronomical pedagogue of his generation. He was born and died in Saalfeld, Saxony.

He was educated, under Jacob Milich, at the University of Wittenberg, where he was first elected dean and later became rector. In 1536 he was appointed professor of higher mathematics by Philipp Melanchthon. In contrast to the limited modern definition, "mathematics" at the time also included applied mathematics, especially astronomy. His colleague, Georg Joachim Rheticus, also studied at Wittenberg and was appointed professor of lower mathematics in 1536.

Reinhold catalogued a large number of stars. His publications on astronomy include a commentary (1542, 1553) on Georg Purbach's Theoricae novae planetarum. Reinhold knew about Copernicus and his heliocentric ideas prior to the publication of his De revolutionibus, and made a favourable reference to him in his commentary on Purbach. However, Reinhold (like other astronomers before Kepler and Galileo) translated Copernicus' mathematical methods back into a geocentric system, rejecting heliocentric cosmology on physical and theological grounds.

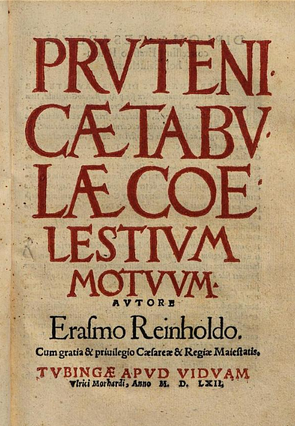
Prutenic Tables (1562 edition)

Duke Albert of Brandenburg Prussia supported Reinhold and financed the printing of Reinhold's Prutenicae Tabulae (1551, 1562, 1571, and 1585) or Prussian Tables. These astronomical tables helped to disseminate calculation methods of Copernicus throughout the Empire, however, Gingerich notes that they showed a "notable lack of commitment" to heliocentricity and were "carefully framed" to be independent of the movement of the Earth. Both Reinhold's Prutenic Tables and Copernicus' studies were the foundation for the Calendar Reform by Pope Gregory XIII in 1582.

It was Reinhold's heavily annotated copy of De revolutionibus in the Royal Observatory, Edinburgh, that started Owen Gingerich on his search for copies of the first and second editions which he describes in The Book Nobody Read. In Reinhold's unpublished commentary on De revolutionibus, he calculated the distance from the Earth to the Sun. He "massaged" his calculation method in order to arrive at an answer close to that of Ptolemy.

His name has been given to a prominent lunar impact crater that lies to the south-southwest of the crater Copernicus, on the Mare Insularum.
