= Achmet (oneiromancer) =

Writer

Achmet, son of Seirim (Ancient Greek: Ἀχμὲτ υἱὸς Σειρείμ), the author of a work on the interpretation of dreams, the Great Book of Interpretation of Dreams, is probably not the same person as Abu Bekr Mohammed Ben Sirin, whose work on the same subject is still extant in Arabic in the Royal Library at Paris, and who was born AH 33 (AD 653-4) and died AH 110 (AD 728-9).

The two names Ahmed or Achimet and Mohammed consist in Arabic of four letters each, and differ only in the first.

There are many differences between Achmet's work, in the form in which we have it, and that of Ibn Sirin, as the writer of the former (or the translator) appears from internal evidence to have been certainly a Christian, (c. 2, 150, &c.) It exists only in Greek, or rather it has only been published in that language.

It consists of three hundred and four chapters, and professes to be derived from what has been written on the same subject by the Indians, Persians, and Egyptians. It was translated out of Greek into Latin about the year 1160, by Leo Tuscus, of which work two specimens are to be found in Gasp. Barthii Adversaria. Around 1165, it was used as a source by Pascalis Romanus for his Liber thesauri occulti, a Latin compilation on dream interpretation that also draws on Artemidorus. It was first published at Frankfort, 1577, 8vo., in a Latin translation, made by Leunclavius, from a very imperfect Greek manuscript, with the title "Apomasaris Apotelesmata, sive de Significatis et Eventis Insomniorum, ex Indorum, Persarum, Aegyptiorumque Disciplina."

The word Apomasares is a corruption of the name of the famous Albumasar, or Abu Ma'shar, and Leunclavius afterwards acknowledged his mistake in attributing the work to him. It was published in Greek and Latin by Rigaltius, and appended to his edition of the Oneirocritica of Artemidorus, Lutet. Paris. 1603, 4to., and some Greek various readings are inserted by Jacobus De Rhoer in his Otium Daventriense. It has also been translated into Italian, French, and German.

== Teachings ==
In a dream, a tall, kind eunuch represents an angel.
