= Arbitrary arrest and detention =

Deprivation of liberty without regard to applicable law

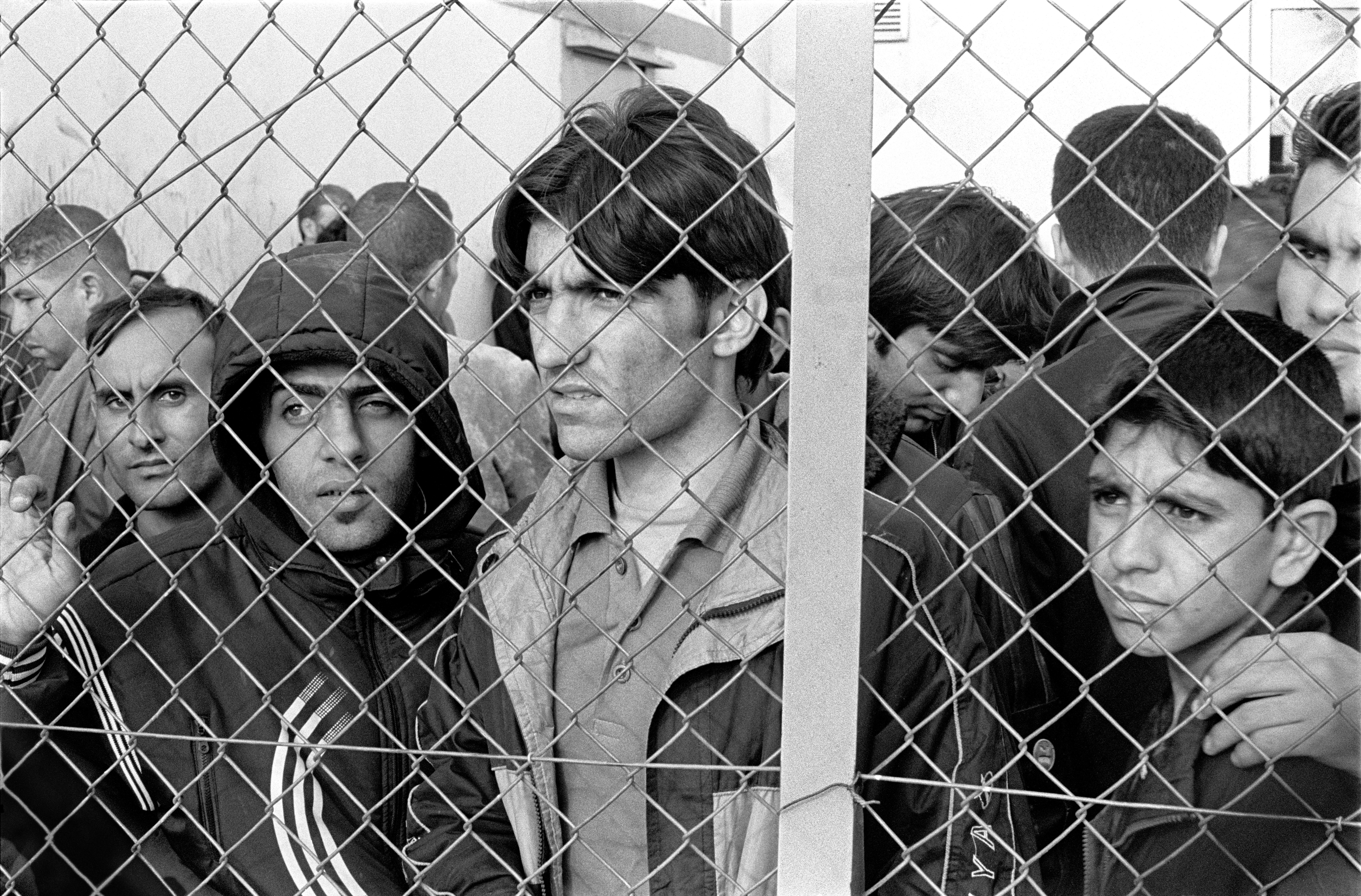
Arrested refugee-immigrants in Fylakio detention center, Evros, Greece.

Arbitrary arrest and detention is the arrest or detention of an individual in a case in which there is no likelihood or evidence that they committed a crime against legal statute, or in which there has been no proper due process of law or order. Arbitrary arrest and detention is similar to but legally distinct from wrongful detention, which is broader in scope and does not involve arrest.

== Background ==
Virtually all individuals who are arbitrarily arrested are given no explanation as to why they are being arrested, and they are not shown any arrest warrant. Depending on the social context, many or the vast majority of arbitrarily arrested individuals may be held incommunicado and their whereabouts can be concealed from their family, associates, the public population and open trial courts.

== International law ==
Arbitrarily depriving an individual of their liberty is prohibited under international human rights law. Article 9 of the 1948 Universal Declaration of Human Rights decrees that "no one shall be subjected to arbitrary arrest, detention or exile"; that is, no individual, regardless of circumstances, is to be deprived of their liberty or exiled from their country without having first committed an actual criminal offense against a legal statute, and the government cannot deprive an individual of their liberty without proper due process of law. As well, the International Covenant on Civil and Political Rights specifies the protection from arbitrary arrest and detention by the Article 9. The implementation of the Covenants is monitored by the United Nations Human Rights Committee.

== Examples by country ==
=== Angola ===
Although Angolan law forbids arbitrary arrest, it occurs often. Warrants are technically required, but arrests are often made without them, and about 75 percent of searches take place without a warrant. Authorities have been known to detain family members of suspected criminals. The constitution requires that suspects be promptly brought to court to determine the legality of their detention, but this requirement is often violated. Authorities do generally conform to the requirement that suspects be informed of charges within five days of being taken into custody. There is an inefficient bail system for minor offences, with prison officials demanding bribes to release inmates. In 2009, over 500 people were being held illegally. In mining areas, security forces detain, rape, and abuse illegal immigrants and their families. Political opponents of the regime are also arbitrarily arrested. Defendants are technically allowed to have lawyers, and indigent defendants are entitled to government-paid representation, but this right is often ignored. Suspects are often subjected to very long periods of pretrial detention. Instead of being put on trial, many suspects are beaten and then released. Others are detained past the legal time limit.

=== Azerbaijan ===
Since 2020, Azerbaijan has detained over 160 Armenians, including civilians, former soldiers, and leaders of Nagorno-Karabakh. It is a common practice for Azerbaijan to arbitrarily detain civilians. Arbitrary arrests and detentions of Armenians have occurred within territories acquired by Azerbaijan following the 2020 Nagorno-Karabakh War, within internationally recognized Armenian territory, and within areas of the Armenia-Azerbaijani border.

A fact-finding mission jointly conducted by multiple human rights organizations concluded, "in all documented instances of civilian detention...Azerbaijani authorities failed to provide justifiable grounds, rendering these detentions arbitrary under both IHL [International Humanitarian Law] and IHRL [International Human Rights Law]." Multiple human rights organizations and experts condemned Azerbaijan for its detention of Armenians in Nagorno-Karabakh, describing the actions as a "war crime," illegal, or considering the charges to be fabricated to support sham trials.

The European Parliament, Nobel Prize laureates, business leaders, former heads of state, and humanitarians have called on Azerbaijan to release Armenians who have been arrested. Other human rights advocates stated that the incarceration of Armenians from Nagorno-Karabakh, including their leaders, is genocidal or aims to legitimize the ethnic cleansing of the region. A fact-finding mission carried out by Freedom House and other human rights organizations concluded that — together with other actions — Azerbaijan’s practice of arbitrary arrest and detention of civilians “meet the criteria for ethnic cleansing as understood in the context of the former Yugoslavia conflict.”

=== Bolivia ===
Arbitrary arrest is illegal, although such arrests do take place. Under the law, detainees have the right to face a judge within 24 hours, although this right is not always honored. Most defendants cannot afford a lawyer and the supply of public defenders is insufficient. Although Bolivian law prohibits pretrial periods exceeding 18 months, it is common for periods of pretrial detention to last longer than this. On the orders of a social worker, children between 11 and 16 may be held indefinitely in special centers without judicial review. Although torture is forbidden under the Bolivian constitution and law, security forces frequently engage in it, and punishment for such violations is rare.

=== Democratic Republic of the Congo ===
The law prohibits arbitrary arrest and detention; however, government security forces arbitrarily arrested and detained persons, including journalists. in 2020, authorities have intimidated, harassed, and detained journalists, activists, and politicians who have publicly criticized the government, president, or SSF.

=== Guinea ===
While the constitution prohibits arbitrary arrest and detention, its practice is quite common. Prisoners are beaten and raped by police. Action by Christians for the Abolition of Torture alleges that four youths accused of stealing were tortured by police in 2011. Abuses at the Kassa Island military prison in 2009 reportedly included castration. Amnesty has two reports of the use of torture in 2011: in February a man in Mamou was taken to the local police station after setting up roadblocks and beaten while handcuffed. In April a man was arrested in Dixinn and beaten at a local station.

Torture is used by "judicial police officers" to coerce confessions from detainees.

On 19 February 2025, the national coordinator of the Forum of the social forces of Guinea, Abdoul Sacko, was kidnapped and tortured. In June 2025, the Lawyer's Order of Guinea boycotted hearings for two weeks and their members left national institutions in which they served in reaction to the kidnapping and torture of Mohamed Traoré, the Order's ex-bâtonnier and a critic of Doumbouya.

=== Iran ===
Iran has been widely criticized for arbitrary arrests and detentions, particularly of journalists, activists, dual nationals, and political opponents. Human rights organizations like Amnesty International and Human Rights Watch have repeatedly reported cases of individuals being detained without due process, fair trials, or clear charges.

Iran has been accused of arresting foreign and dual nationals (especially from Western countries) to use them as bargaining chips in political negotiations. Political activists, human rights defenders, and journalists often face imprisonment on vague charges like "spreading propaganda against the system" or "acting against national security." Ethnic and religious minorities, such as Kurds, Baháʼís, and Sunnis, are disproportionately arrested.

=== Iraq ===
In mid-August 2020, protests erupted in the Kurdistan region of Iraq concerning corruption, the improvement of public services, and pay owed to government employees. In response, the regional government arbitrarily arrested activists and journalists covering the protests under the pretext of preserving “national security”. Some were detained anywhere from several days to six months.

=== Mauritania ===
The Constitution and statutes of Mauritania prohibit arbitrary arrest and detention, but authorities in 2011 did not observe these prohibitions. In some cases, authorities arbitrarily arrested and detained protesters and journalists.

Human rights and other observers accused the government of exceeding the legal limits for pretrial detention in 2011. Security forces, at times, arrested demonstrators engaged in sit-ins, marches, or rallies, and held them longer than the regulations allow. On 29 September, the media reported that following a violent protest in Nouakchott against the national registration initiative, security forces entered private residences without warrants and arrested approximately 20 individuals.

By law, a minor may not be held for more than six months while awaiting trial. Nevertheless, there were reports in 2011 that a large number of individuals, including minors, remained in pretrial detention for extended periods due to judicial ineptitude.

=== Mozambique ===
An arrest is arbitrary when there is insufficient evidence to condemn an individual, and when there is no legal basis to the arrest. The law states that anyone that is detained without legal basis or on the foundation of insufficient evidence should be released, however the authorities of Mozambique have that responsibility, and have been found to not follow this law strictly.

According to Amnesty International, the Mozambican police have been found to arrest citizens without sufficient reason or evidence to do so. Many detainees in detention centres are being held while their case is still being investigated. They were arrested on the suspicion of theft, and some are held in these pre-trial facilities for almost a year, while police investigate the case, providing the assumption that the arrests were arbitrary and on suspicious grounds.

The Mozambican law also states that an arrest is arbitrary if it does not comply with the procedures for arrest set out in the Criminal Procedure Code. Amnesty International has documented arrests that do not comply with these procedures due to failing to inform those being arrested and detaining their rights. Violating a detainee's rights can include not allowing them to see a lawyer, forcing detainees to sign documents, or beating or ill-treating detainees to force them to confess.

=== Thailand ===
Since the beginning of 2021, prominent human rights defenders and democracy activists were charged with the possibility of more than 100 years each on criminal charges for their involvement in pro-democracy activism. The leading figures of the 2020–2021 Thai protests that called for reforms to the monarchy, Arnon Nampa, Panupong Jadnok, Parit Chiwarak, Jatupat (Pai Dao Din), Panusaya (Rung), and Benja Apan, were all detained awaiting trial in 2021 in a series of detainments and releases. Some were imprisoned accumulatively for more than 200 days after Prime Minister Prayut Chan-o-cha issued a declaration in November 2020 to charge protesters with offenses under all laws, including lèse-majesté.

In 2022, there were multiple cases of systematic harassment and detention against young monarchy-reform activists, such as that of Tantawan Tuatulanon, who protested her imprisonment by going on a hunger strike for 37 days. Most activists who mentioned the monarchy were also forced to wear electronic monitoring anklets by the criminal court. More than 15 dissidents are still imprisoned to this day.

=== United Arab Emirates ===
Between 2015 and 2017, the United States sent a number of detainees of various nationalities, some only suspects, from Guantanamo Bay detention camp to the UAE. According to US officials, the agreement reached with UAE to accept these prisoners did not include their continued imprisonment. By 2020, nineteen remained in detention in often undisclosed locations, in harsh conditions, and with little access to outside communication. In at least one case, a detainee was sent to a facility reported by the Associated Press to be "a notorious prison rife with torture". One Afghani detainee was returned home after more than three years in UAE prisons, dying four months after his release. He recounted harsh, inhumane treatment in UAE, describing it as "mental torture".

Since October 2020, UAE authorities have, on the basis of religious background, detained, at times incommunicado, at least four Pakistani men and deported at least six others. Reports of UAE authorities arbitrarily targeting Shia residents, whether Lebanese, Iraqi, Afghan, Pakistani, or otherwise, often emerge at times of increased regional tensions.

On 18 November 2024, Dubai police arrested a Kyrgyz dissident, Kudaibergen uluu, who was visiting the Emirate to meet other activists of Kyrgyzstan. He was informed that the Kyrgyzstan government had requested for his extradition. Kudaibergen uluu was released within 24 hours, but was kept under investigation. On 3 January 2025, he was arrested again by Dubai police, stayed for half a day, based on another extradition request from Kyrgyz government over bogus charges of fraud. The new extradition request was being considered by the UAE. Kudaibergen uluu, who lives in exile in the US, was trapped in Dubai and unable to travel back because of his missing passport. A joint letter from human rights organizations, including International partnership for Human Rights (IPHR), Freedom for Eurasia, Freedom Now, and the Norwegian Helsinki Committee, called on the UAE to not force Kudaibergen uluu to return to Kyrgyzstan, where he is likely to face, arbitrary detention, torture, unfair trial, ill treatment and other human right abuses. They warned the UAE to ensure his safety, liberty and to coordinate with the US to send him back to his family.

=== United States ===
Arbitrary arrest and detention are not uncommon in the United States. In 2006, Amnesty International condemned the Bush administration for "years of arbitrary and indefinite detention" at the Guantanamo Bay detention camp. Amnesty International also reported in 2018 that the average daily population of arbitrarily detained immigrants in the United States was projected to reach 47,000 people by 2019. It further reported that 15 LGBTQ people interviewed had been arbitrarily detained in the United States without parole for periods ranging from several months to 2.5 years. In 2025, the widespread arbitrary detention of European and Canadian tourists in the United States, including the Canadian actress Jasmine Mooney, lead to increased fears abroad about traveling to the country. In May 2025, Amnesty International reported that the United States had arbitrarily detained asylum seekers and violated their rights to due process and their rights to legal resources. It reported that immigrants from Venezuela were disproportionately targeted by arbitrary arrest and human rights violations such as physical abuse by authorities. In July 2025, a United States citizen and United States Army veteran named George Retes was arbitrarily detained by ICE for three days.

== See also ==
- Hostage diplomacy
- Wrongful detention
- False arrest
- False imprisonment
- Forced disappearance
- Habeas corpus
- Kettling
- Mass arrest
- Preemptive arrest
- Preventive detention
- Retaliatory arrest and prosecution
- Working Group on Arbitrary Detention
