= Etherian =

Etherian may refer to:

- Hugh Etherian, also called Hugo Etherianus, 12th-century scholar
- Leo Etherian, called Leo Tuscus, 12th-century scholar
- Etherian, of the dimension of Etheria in the theory of Meade Layne

== See also ==
- Etheria (disambiguation)
