= Superstition in Islamic tradition =

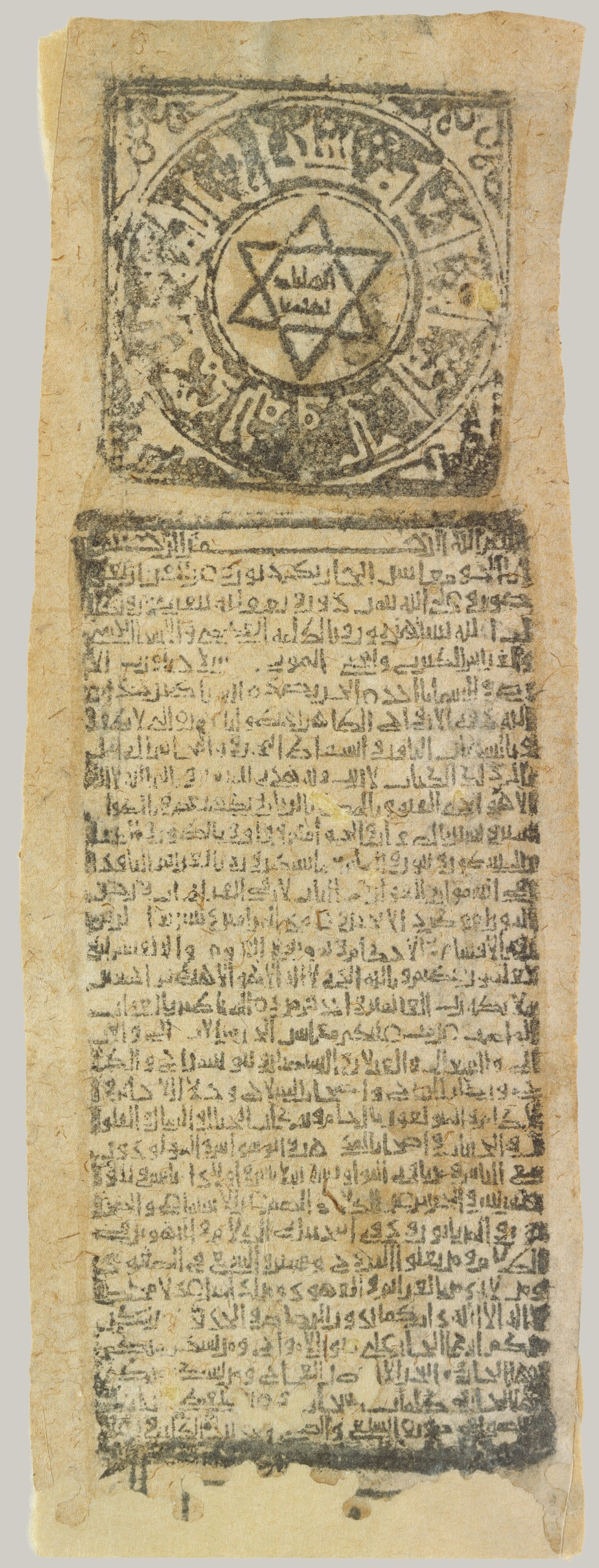
11th century, Fatimid amulet in Kufic script with six-pointed Solomon's seal, Metropolitan Museum of Art

Despite Islamic tradition taking a generally dim view of superstitious belief in supernatural causality for mundane events, various beliefs in supernatural phenomena have persisted in Muslim societies since the advent of Islam. In Muslim scholarship, the various Islamic schools and branches have contested and probed beliefs and practices that were assumed to be superstitious, but beliefs in Quranic charms, jinn, and the practice of visiting the tombs of religious remain.

Some beliefs, such as the belief in jinn and other aspects of Muslim occult culture, are rooted in the Quran and the culture of early Islamic cosmography. In the same way, shrine veneration and acceptance, and the promotion of saintly miracles, has intimate connections to structures of Islamic religious authority and piety in Islamic history. The study of superstitions in Muslim societies has raised difficult but important questions for Islamic revivalist projects, including by challenging the historical stability, coherence and distinctness of Islam as a religion.

== Context, background and history ==
According to Ali Rahnema, while superstitious ideas may have been equally common among Christians and Muslims until the 16th century AD, in comparison to the Muslim world, the prevalence and intensity among Christians dramatically declined after reformation movements in Europe.

Muslims facing illness or other crises found strength and reassurance in various religious objects and rituals. According to Travis Zadeh, in spite of talismanic use of the Quran in charms and amulets, tomb visitation evoked much censure in certain orthodox circles. Still in urban centers of the Muslim world, of the pre-modern era active culture of shrine visitation used to be too common. As such both orthodox and folk popular domains of Islamic religious performance build on the power of baraka (divine blessing or charisma) derived through sacred matter. So, various expressions of Quranic theurgy, from charms and amulets to inscriptions on bowls and garments are as much pervasive, converging with ancient attitudes toward divine language and sacred writing.

According to Christiane Gruber, Islamic tradition regards water as having healing properties and associates it with cleanliness and godliness. The Quran says water is the source of "every living thing". Since the seventh century, Muslim pilgrims have visited the Zamzam Well, believing its water to be curative, and using it in cleaning rituals and prayer. From the 11th century until around the 19th century, Muslim cultures used magic bowls, healing necklaces and other objects like amulets, talismanic shirt, and scrolls in hopes of warding off drought, famine, floods and even epidemic diseases. Anti-plague talismans known as the "Garden of Names", Quranic scrolls and amulets were worn around the neck or otherwise attached to the body, believing that physical contact with the object would unlock the enclosed blessings or life force, known as baraka in Arabic.

According to Zadeh, the same is true about magic in its various manifestations, which explains a good deal about how the bounds of the licit and the illicit have historically been defined and negotiated. In the modern period, Muslim societies, faced with varied discourses of demystification, the domains of the magical and the enchanted went through substantial reconfiguration in the expressions of Islamic piety, devotion, and learning. Zadeh says the process of modernization in Muslim world, with its grounding in European colonialism and post-Enlightenment thought, as well as in Islamic reformism, has contested and reconfigured many historical and traditional practices, often viewed them as being ignorance and superstitious. This can be observed, for example, rather notably in critiques or corrective advice literature propagated by a range of Muslim scholars toward such activities as exorcism, shrine devotion, and the preparation of amulets, most of such discourse is rooted in classical Islamic exegesis; but, they take on profoundly different expressions in the context of modern Islamic reform. In the competing views of normativity, magic, marvel, and miracle ultimately takes role of normative categories designed not only to understand the world but also to shape it.

=== Differences between superstitions ===
At least one author, Ali Rahmena, distinguishes between "accidental or autonomous" superstition, and magic such as sorcery and witchcraft, black and white. While superstition is "accidental" (for example, no one intends for a black cat to cross their path, so it is accidental), with magic believers are convinced that the laws of nature can be altered by the sorcerer or witch through supernatural forces. A second distinction, according to Ali, is between superstition connected to religion and superstition that is not.

== Occultism ==
Ulum al-ghariba ("occult sciences") or Ulum al-hafiya ("secret sciences") refers to occultism in Islam. Occultism in Islam includes various practices like talismans and interpreting dreams. Simiyya is a doctrine found commonly within Sufi-occult traditions that may be deduced upon the notion of "linking the superior natures with the inferior...", and broadly described as theurgy.

=== Sufism ===
According to Owen Davies Sufis have been criticized by both Wahhabi and modernist Muslims for some of their perceived superstitious practices. According to J.D.Kila along with other desecration and destruction of Sufi places of worship and cultural heritage, a sacred door of Sidi Yahya Mosque was forcefully destroyed because some people believed that door should not to be opened till end of the world.

=== Devils, Ghoul and Jinn ===
In Arabic folklore, the ghul is said to dwell in cemeteries and other uninhabited places. A male ghoul is referred to as ghul while the female is called ghulah. While analyzing beliefs in unseen and supernatural angels like Munkar and Nakir visits to tombs in Islamic eschatology, John MacDonald says that origination of such ideas is likely to be then contemporary folklore or superstition. When Islam spread outside of Arabia, belief in the jinn was assimilated with local belief about spirits and deities from Iran, Africa, Turkey and India.

Since the jinn, unlike many spirits and demons in other religions, are thought to be physical beings, Muslims adhere to superstitious practices like uttering dastur before throwing hot water or urinating, warning jinn to leave the place so as to not feel offended by humans.

Due to their physical presence, Islamic scholars debated about legal issues of marriage between jinn and humans, leading to a far reaching belief in sexual union between supernatural creatures and humans. Shayāṭīn (devils), are another type of supernatural creature, deriving from Judeo-Christian demons. According to the Quran they frequently assault heaven but are warded off by angels throwing meteors on them, therefore some Muslims curse the shayatin when seeing a shooting star, believing it was thrown at a shaitan.

=== Exorcism ===
Exorcism in Islam is called ʿazaʿim. Ruqya (Arabic: رقية) on the other hand summons jinn and demons by invoking the names of God, and to command them to abandon their mischief and is thought to repair damage believed caused by jinn possession, witchcraft (sihr) or the evil eye. Exorcisms today are part of a wider body of contemporary Islamic alternative medicine.

Morocco has many possession traditions, including exorcism rituals.

=== Magic ===
Islam distinguishes between God-given gifts or good magic and black magic. Good supernatural powers are therefore a special gift from God, whereas black magic is achieved through help of jinn and shayatin. In the Quranic narrative, Sulayman had the power to speak with animals and command jinn, and he thanks God for this نعمة (i.e. gift, privilege, favour, bounty), which is only given to him with God's permission.^{[Quran 27:19]}

=== Nazar (amulet) and taʿwīdh ===
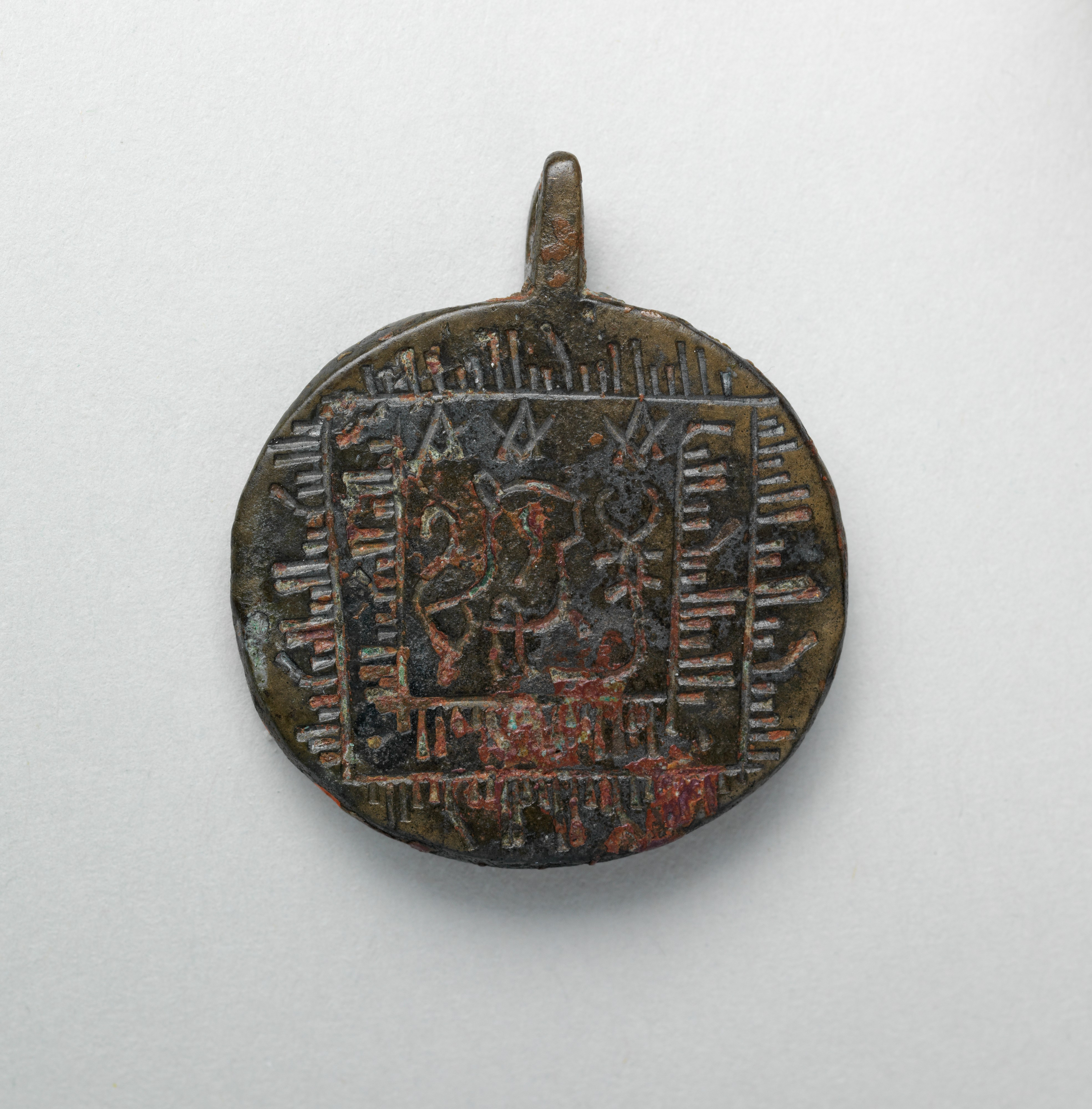
Bronze cast talismanic pendant, c.10th century, Nishapur, Iran. The zodiac signs of Leo and Scorpio feature beneath three Solomonic seals and are surrounded by pseudo-writing that resembles the expression "There is no deity but God" in Arabic script. The Metropolitan Museum of Art

The taʿwiz or taʿwīdh (Arabic: تعويذ) is an amulet or locket usually containing verses from the Quran or other Islamic prayers and symbols pertaining to magic. The Tawiz is worn by some Muslims to protect them from evil.

The amulet called nazar is supposed to protect against the evil eye, a superstition shared among several cultures including Muslim ones.

=== Natural phenomena ===
While Solar eclipse and Lunar eclipses, Earthquakes, Thunder and lightning are just natural phenomena as per modern scientific explanations; and Islam avoids irrational connections of the same with other coincidences in human life, still some Muslim individuals and communities are seen singling out specific natural objects and events as signs of God and special sign prayers (salat al-Ayat) are observed on occasions like Solar eclipse and Lunar eclipses, Earthquakes, Thunder and lightning.

== Karamat ==
Miracles in Islam play less of an evidentiary role. The Quran is considered the main miracle of the Prophet Muhammad, though the Quran mentions miracles like Jesus talking in infancy. In Sunni Islam, karamat refers to supernatural wonders performed by Muslim saints. In the technical vocabulary of Islamic religious sciences, the singular form karama has a sense similar to charism, a favor or spiritual gift freely bestowed by God. The marvels ascribed to Muslim walis have included supernatural physical actions, predictions of the future, and "interpretation of the secrets of hearts". A widespread belief holds that even ordinary humans can become walis and endowed by God with supernatural powers. Such wali played a significant role in missionary activities (dawah).

== Contemporary traditions ==
=== Iran ===
It is claimed by some experts that first minerals, fruits, mountains and seas that accepted Islam, Prophet Mohammed and Shia Imam Ali Velayat include eggplant, gold, fresh water oceans, mount agate. Persian melon is said to not have accepted Velayat by prophet's quote according to Mohammad-Baqer Majlesi. After the death of Abbas the Great his burial place was not designated prior to avoid Talisman. Dogs are called Najis.

According to author Ali Rahnema's analysis of "superstition as an ideology" in the politics of Iran, during the eight-year administration of Mahmoud Ahmadinejad (2005–2013) "superstition begot phantasmical claims and practices", immersing a small cross-section of Iranians into "an alarming frenzy of irrationality" (in contrast to emphasis on aql (reason) of his predecessor Mohammad Khatami). An example of one of these claims was Ahmadinejad's insistence (in a videoes meeting with Ayatollah Javadi Amoli) that during his (Ahmadinejad's) 28 minute speech to the UN General Assembly in 2005, Ahmadinejad had been enshrouded in a beam of light and that the Assembly audience had been fixated on him and incapable of blinking their eyes while he spoke.

=== South Asia ===
Among Muslims in India and Pakistan, magical thinking pervades as many acts and events are attributed to supernatural and ritual, such as prayer, sacrifice, or the observance of a taboo are followed. The penchant for faith healers and black magicians spans society, from the rich landlords of the rural areas to the urban classes of Hyderabad Deccan, Bangalore, Lahore and Karachi. In India and Pakistan, mental illness and psychological problems are often considered to be an encounter with Shaitan (Satan) (Urdu: شيطان, Hindi: शैतान), evil jinn (Urdu: جن, Hindi: जिन) or demons who have taken over one's body and mind. People, especially children and young girls, wear taʿwiz (amulets) (Urdu: تعویز, Hindi: तावीज़) to ward off the evil eye. Spells, incantations and curses could also result in ghouls or churel (Urdu: چڑیل, Hindi: चुड़ैल) haunting a person.

Muslim walis (Imams, Maulvis, Sufis, Mullahs, Faqirs) perform exorcism on individuals who are believed to be possessed. The homes, houses, buildings and grounds are blessed and consecrated by Mullahs or Imams by reciting Quran and Adhan (Urdu: أَذَان), the Islamic call to prayer, recited by the muezzin. Some of the popular superstitions in India and Pakistan included that black cats crossing one's path will bring bad luck, a crow's cawing announces the surprise arrival of guests, consuming dairy products with seafood will cause skin diseases, itchy palms means presage monetary gains, resting under trees after dark carries the risk of demonic possession, twitching of the left eye is an ill-omen, and sneezing can be caused by being in another's thoughts.

== Islamic responses ==
=== Mu'tazilite rational response ===
Throughout the history, Mu'tazilite theologians and philosophers have always attempted to answer the questions of miracles, jinn, supernaturalism and superstition in Islam through rational and dialectical methods. Mu’tazilites believe that God and the firmaments of His creation could only operate in accordance with rational rules that He himself has established. The universal realm operates through a system that is determinate in as much as it is orderly, where everything functions in an organised manner, from the smallest atom to the biggest planets, stars, galaxies and other universe objects. Everything is neatly arranged according to natural rules related to the laws of physics, chemistry, biology, mathematics and empirical laws.

Many Mu'tazilites believed in the theory of nature (ṭabʽ) put forward by some early Muʽtazilite scholars such as Mu‘ammar al-Sulami (d. 215/830), Abū Ishaq Ibrāhīm an-Nazzam (d. 231/845), Abu Uthman Al-Jāḥiẓ (d. 255/869) and Abū al-Qāsim al-Kaʽbī (d. 319/931) as well as its consequences are about causality and miracles. Proponents of the ṭabʽ theory argue that Allah created all creatures with innate conditions and that these natures determine all movements and events in the universe, and that the necessary causal relationships based on them apply in the universe.

However, this understanding was criticized and rejected by the majority of Muslim theologians. Acceptance of necessary causality in the universe would make it impossible for God to intervene in nature, for example in creating miracles. On the contrary, in understanding miracles, the Mu'tazilites believe that God gave the prophets most of the logical prophetic miracles, such as the miracle of the creation of the Quran, which for most Muslims is considered the greatest and most important prophetic miracle. Of course, the creation of the Quran is a logical thing. Whereas, prophetic miracles which have irrational content contained in the Quran or hadith must be considered as something metaphorical, because they consider Arabic to be known as a language that contains many metaphorical idioms, where Arabic is the language contained in these propositions.

In matters of superstition such as jinn possession, magic, and myth which are often mixed with religious beliefs, for the Mu'tazilites this is a deviation from religion. Which for Mu'tazilite, Islam is logical. Some Mu'taziite scholars such as Al-Jubba'i and Al-Zamakhshari reject the possibility of someone being possessed by a jinn, they consider the argument of jinn possession to be based on a misunderstanding of Quranic interpretation. Furthermore, a Mu'tazila scholar and biologist, Al-Jahiz, formulated a scientific explanation for why people develop epilepsy, mental illness, and innate fear from a biological and psychological perspective, far from understanding the majority of orthodox schools of thought that it is all caused by jinn possession or magic.

=== Flexible modernist discourse ===
According to Daniel W. Brown a whole genre of devout literature exists to ascribe miraculous proofs of Muhammad's prophesy, shaped with the purpose of establishing Muhammad's prophetic credentials, many traditional scholars like Ibn Ishaq described various miracles, like a palm tree sighs as prophet passes, at prophet's command a cluster of dates jumps off the tree, the moon is split down the middle, with very small amount of food the prophet feeds the crowd. Brown says to remain sensitive discomfiture of modern audiences such descriptions of miracles are systematically expunged and hence modern audiences grown with sanitized accounts of the prophet get startled with pervasiveness of miracles in early biographies of Muhammad. According to Brown many modern Muslims and non Muslims may agree that probably, Muhammad would not have performed any miracles, and view such miracles as a relic of superstitions, and hence why many modern Muslims may wish the miracle accounts to disappear since Quran itself implies that Muhammad did not perform any miracles.

Influenced by Al-Afghani's modernist interpretations, Muhammad Abduh, a mufti of Egypt revisited then contemporary Islamic thought with his ijtihad post–1899 AD in his tafsir al Manar, expressed that, wherever the Quran seemed contradictory and irrational to logic and science, it must be understood as reflecting the Arab vision of the world, as written with available 7th century intellectual level of Arabs; all verses referring to superstitions like witchcraft and the evil eye be explained as expressions of then–Arab beliefs; and miraculous events and deeds in Quran be rationally explained just as metaphors or allegories.

In their research paper, Jafar Nekoonam, Fatemeh Sadat, and Moosavi Harami discuss the verity of interpretations about the Quranic concept dealt in verses 15:16-18, 37:6-10, 72:8-9, 67:5 of stone throwing devils with meteors. According to Jafar Nekoonam et al., 2016, various interpretations for what the Quran means by stone throwing devils with meteors have been put forward by Muslim exegetes over the centuries. In the pre-modern times, the meaning of this Quranic expression was assumed to be clear, Meccan unbelievers would accuse the Prophet of getting the revelation from the jinn. According to Jafar Nekoonam et al., the Quran responded to their allegations by saying that jinn had no access to the heavenly discourse, as the heavens were protected with meteors. But since, in the modern times, scientific community has denied any relation in between meteors and devils and meteors being simply stones that are scattered across the universe, burning and transforming into fire after entering the earth's atmosphere. The way the interpreters of the Quran understood the verses in question has been changed with the modern era scientific developments.

According to Jafar Nekoonam et al., some commentators considered the idea of stone throwing devils with meteors in relation to the immaterial world, presumed beyond human understanding; hence, they would refrain from interpreting it. But according to Jafar Nekoonam et al., such attitude does not explain how mentioning an incomprehensible idea would have functioned as a response to the accusations of Meccan disbelievers of the time of the Prophet. Other interpreters say that it is possible that the meteors actually force away the jinn from the abode of angels, but this theory would not be acceptable either, since angels are not material beings to live in the material sky. Some other scholars suggested non-literal interpretations for these verses. They assumed that these Quranic verses did not refer to material meteors or heavens, but referred to just the fact that jinn were not allowed to enter God's throne. Jafar Nekoonam et al says such interpretation would mean that during the first fourteen centuries of Islam, the verses of the Quran were misunderstood, which would not be in line with the fact that the Quran is the guide for all mankind of all times. Based on this analysis, Jafar Nekoonam et al concludes that the right interpretation would be to say that the Quran employs the idea of stone throwing devils with meteors, which was familiar to its original audience, in order to reject the accusation by Meccan unbelievers that the Prophet received the revelation from devils. Interpreting the Quran to say in fact states in the form of that familiar idea, is that devils are supposed to be incapable of ascending to the spiritual world of angels to receive heavenly guidance. Thus, in this theory, such interpretation, both the literal meaning of the verses in question, which was what Muslim understanding in the past fourteen centuries, and the purity of the Quran from unscientific claims can be preserved.

== See also ==
- Astrology in medieval Islam
- Great Book of Interpretation of Dreams
- Iman (Islam) § The Six Articles of Faith
- Islamic attitudes towards science
- Islamic view of miracles
- Magic and religion
- Religion#Superstition

== Bibliography ==
- Rahnema, Ali (2011-06-06). Superstition as Ideology in Iranian Politics: From Majlesi to Ahmadinejad. Cambridge University Press. ISBN 978-1-139-49562-2. Archived from the original on 2020-12-05.
- Rothenberg, Celia E. (2011-09-22). "Islam on the Internet: the Jinn and the objectification of Islam". Journal of Religion and Popular Culture. 23 (3): 358–371. doi:10.3138/jrpc.23.3.358.

== In popular culture ==
- Muzaffar, Ayesha. Abu's Jinns. Amazon Digital Services LLC - KDP Print US, 2018.
