= Massacre of the Latins =

1182 massacre of Roman Catholics in Constantinople

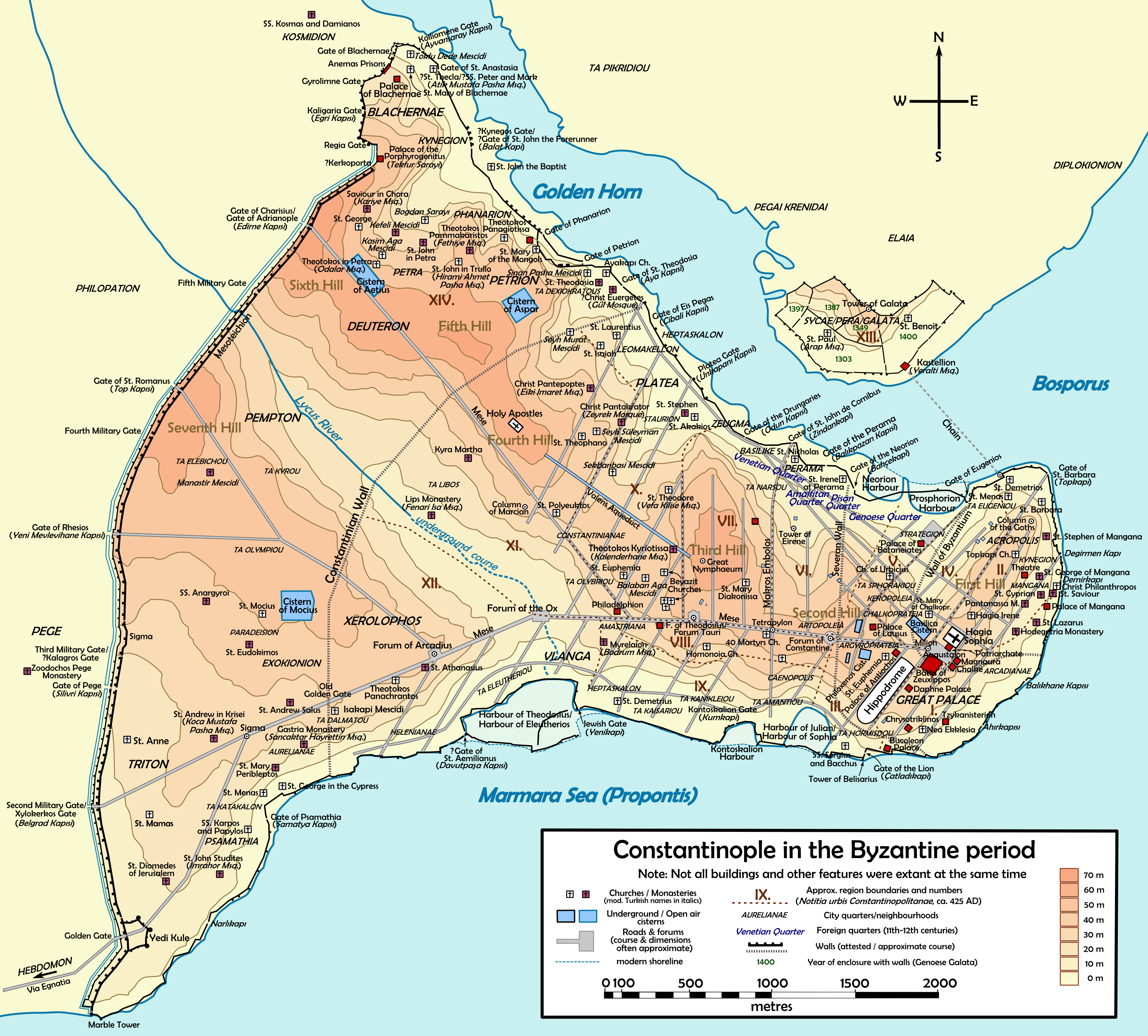
- Map of Constantinople in the Byzantine period. The Latin quarters are captioned in purple.
- Location: 41.016°N 28.975°E; Constantinople, Byzantine Empire
- Date: April 1182
- Target: Genoese and Pisan merchants
- Attack type: Massacre
- Deaths: See death toll
- Perpetrators: Andronikos I Komnenos' Paphlagonian henchmen; Constantinopolitan mob ("mainly [composed] of people from the lower strata of society: workers, the poor, and certainly all kind of criminals")
- Motive: Displeasure with the merchants' wealth and privileged status; Desire to plunder

The Massacre of the Latins was a massacre of Genoese and Pisans in Constantinople, the capital of the Byzantine Empire, in April 1182.

After Manuel I Komnenos' death in 1180, the Genoese and the Pisans of Constantinople dominated the city's maritime trade and financial sector, largely due to favouritism by the Latin princess and regent Maria of Antioch. This caused a coup d'etat in April 1182 by Andronikos I Komnenos, who entered the city with a wave of popular support.

Almost immediately after the coup, violence erupted in the Latin quarters, inhabited by Genoese and Pisans, ending up in a massacre. Although Andronikos himself had no particular anti-Latin attitude, he allowed his Paphlagonian henchmen and the Constantinopolitan mob to proceed with the massacre unchecked. Displeasure with their wealth and privileged status of the merchants, as well as a desire by the mob to plunder and loot, are considered to have been the motives for the massacre.

Although precise numbers are unavailable, most Genoese and Pisans, which are estimated at less than 3,900 individuals, were either wiped out or forced to flee.

The impact of the massacre was negligible; it was almost immediately forgotten and only helped Venice re-establish relations with the Byzantine Empire, as their mercantile opponents, the Genoese and the Pisans, had been eliminated from the city.

== Background ==
From the late 11th century, Western merchants, primarily from the Italian city-states of Venice, Genoa, and Pisa, had started appearing in the East. The first had been the Venetians, who had secured large-scale trading concessions from Byzantine emperor Alexios I Komnenos (Byzantine–Venetian treaty of 1082). Subsequent extensions of these privileges and Byzantium's own naval impotence at the time resulted in a virtual maritime monopoly and stranglehold over the Empire by the Venetians.

Alexios' grandson, Manuel I Komnenos, wishing to reduce their influence, began to reduce the privileges of Venice while concluding agreements with her rivals: Pisa, Genoa, and Amalfi. Gradually, all four Italian cities were also allowed to establish their own quarters in the northern part of Constantinople itself, towards the Golden Horn.

The predominance of the Italian merchants caused economic and social upheaval in Byzantium: it accelerated the decline of the independent native merchants in favour of big exporters, who became tied to the landed aristocracy, who in turn increasingly amassed large estates. Together with the perceived arrogance of the Italians, it fueled popular resentment amongst the middle and lower classes both in the countryside and in the cities. Displeasure with the merchants' wealth and privileged status, but also a desire by the mob to plunder and loot, are considered the motives for the massacre.

The religious differences between the two sides, who viewed each other as schismatics, further exacerbated the problem. The Italians proved uncontrollable by imperial authority: in 1162, for instance, the Pisans together with a few Venetians raided the Genoese quarter in Constantinople, causing much damage. Emperor Manuel subsequently expelled most of the Genoese and Pisans from the city, thus giving the Venetians a free hand for several years.

In early 1171, however, when the Venetians attacked and largely destroyed the Genoese quarter in Constantinople, the Emperor retaliated by ordering the mass arrest of all Venetians throughout the Empire and the confiscation of their property. A subsequent Venetian expedition in the Aegean failed: a direct assault was impossible due to the strength of the imperial forces, and the Venetians agreed to negotiations, which the Emperor stalled intentionally. As talks dragged on through the winter, the Venetian fleet waited at Chios, until an outbreak of the plague forced them to withdraw.

The Venetians and the Empire remained at war, with the Venetians prudently avoiding direct confrontation but sponsoring Serb uprisings, besieging Ancona, Byzantium's last stronghold in Italy, and signing a treaty with the Norman Kingdom of Sicily. Relations were only gradually normalized: there is evidence of a treaty in 1179, although a full restoration of relations would only be reached in the mid-1180s. Meanwhile, the Genoese and the Pisans profited from the dispute with Venice.

== Death of Manuel I and massacre ==
Following the death of Manuel I in 1180, his widow, the Latin princess Maria of Antioch, acted as regent to her infant son Alexios II Komnenos. Her regency was notorious for the favoritism shown to Latin merchants and the big aristocratic land-owners, and was overthrown in April 1182 by Andronikos I Komnenos, who entered the city with a wave of popular support. Almost immediately, the celebrations spilled over into violence towards the hated Latins (Genoese and Pisans), and after entering the city's Latin quarter, a mob began attacking the inhabitants.

Many had anticipated the events and escaped by sea. During the massacre, houses, churches, and charities were looted. According to William of Tyre, the massacre was indiscriminate. He describes an event in which Cardinal John, the papal legate, was allegedly "murdered and his head was cut off and dragged through the streets fastened to the tail of a dog". However, William was not a direct witness of the event and his account can be considered to have been exaggerated or biased, as he is considered "notorious" for his anti-Byzantine bias.

Although Andronikos himself had no particular anti-Latin attitude, he allowed the massacre to proceed unchecked. According to William of Tyre, the massacre was the work of Andronikos' "innumerable troops of barbarian nations" (referring to Andronikos' Paphlagonian troops) aided by a local mob. Andronikos had managed to incite the anti-Latin sentiment of the mob, on the grounds that the empress and the protosebastos had bought Latin support by promising them the chance of plundering the city.

During the massacre Empress Maria was arrested, before eventually being executed.

== Motives for the massacre ==
The massacre was motivated due to the regency crisis, displeasure with the merchants' wealth and their privileged status in Byzantine society, as well as some of the mobs' desire to loot and plunder. Eustathios of Thessalonika describes a widely believed rumor in which "the Latins planned to attack, rob, and enslave the city’s population, and were backed by the regents, the prōtosebastos Alexios, and the empress dowager Maria-Xene", which allegedly roused the mob further.

The massacre was directed against the Genoese and Pisan inhabitants of the city. Nevertheless, anti-Latin sentiment did not play part as a motive in the massacre. The Byzantines did not hold a more pronounced hatred for either the Genoese or the Pisans than for any other group. According to historian Samuel P. Müller "there is no sound reason to ascribe more ‘Latinophobic’ attitudes to certain segments of the population". He concludes:

Andronikos’s regime was completely discredited after his death, and his actions were widely disapproved of even during his reign. The Latins of Constantinople were victims of his, like many Byzantines, and the massacre was deemed unjust. It was the result of the political struggles of 1180–82 and the propaganda against the supporters of the prōtosebastos rather than of long-standing "Latinophobia".

== Impact ==
The massacre received negligible attention, at the time, and it quickly disappeared from the memories of the Latins in Constantinople. It reduced, but did not halt, Genoese and Pisan trade activities in Constantinople, although relations between the states and the communities were back to normal after 1192, with treaties extending reduced tax rates for transactions being signed. In fact, some Genoese and Pisans, despite having been victims of the massacre, fought on the side of the Byzantine Empire during the Sack of Constantinople (Fourth Crusade) in 1204.

Only a handful of Venetians were present in Constantinople during the massacre, as they were prohibited from doing business there, and the few who remained escaped the city safely, as they were warned by certain people, presumably by their Greek friends. The only reference to the massacre in Venetian records appears tucked away in a commercial document made in Alexandria in June 1182. Venetian chroniclers made no mention of the events and the Republic never requested restitution for damages from later Byzantine emperors either.

Indeed, the events were a "boon" for Venice. It greatly benefited from the massacre, as their Genoese and Pisan opponents were eliminated from the city and Andronikos was forced to turn to Venice for support. According to historian Thomas F. Madden:

The massacre of Pisans and Genoese was a stroke of good fortune for Venice, as it obliged Andronicus I (1183–5) to turn to Venice during his short reign for military support against the Normans, Genoese, and Pisans.

=== Death toll ===
The death toll of the massacre is unknown. It is also unknown whether the "Latins" were its only victims.

Although Eustathios of Thessalonica estimated that up to 60,000 Latins lived in Constantinople at the time of the massacre, this number is considered greatly exaggerated. In 1162, the Genoese chronicle of Caffaro di Rustico da Caschifellone recorded that the to-be victims of the massacre, the Pisans and the Genoese, numbered 1,000 and 300 respectively. Within twenty years, it is considered "hardly possible that their number increased more than a maximum of three times in the following two decades", i.e. 3,900. Historian David Jacoby considers Caffaro's claim that 1,000 Pisans lived in the city to be false and massively inflated, but accepts the figure of 300 Genoese as roughly accurate. Jacoby considers that figures in the thousands are too high regarding the population of Genoese and Pisans, instead believing that figures in the hundreds are far more likely. In addition, most fled before the attack, while some of the few remaining were sheltered by Byzantine nobles, civil servants and merchants who did not participate in the violence.

The Pisan translator and Byzantine chancery official Leo Tuscus was among the Latins who survived the massacre.

== See also ==
- Venetian–Genoese Wars
- Battle of Demetritzes
- East–West Schism
- Catholic-Eastern Orthodox relations

== Sources ==
- Ducellier, Alain (1986). "The death throes of Byzantium: 1080–1261". The Cambridge Illustrated History of the Middle Ages: 950-1250. Cambridge University Press. pp. 489–524. ISBN 978-0-521-26645-1 – via Internet Archive.
- Fine, John V. A. (1994) [1987]. The Late Medieval Balkans: A Critical Survey from the Late Twelfth Century to the Ottoman Conquest. Ann Arbor, Michigan: University of Michigan Press. ISBN 978-0-472-10079-8.
- Nicol, Donald M. (1988). Byzantium and Venice: A Study in Diplomatic and Cultural Relations. Cambridge: Cambridge University Press. ISBN 0-521-34157-4.
