= Leo Tuscus =

12th-century Italian writer and translator

Leo Tuscus (or Leo the Tuscan, fl. 1160/66–1182/83) was an Italian writer and translator who served as a Latin–Greek interpreter in the imperial chancery of the Byzantine Empire under Emperor Manuel Komnenos.

Leo was born in the first half of the twelfth century in Pisa. He was the younger brother of Hugo Etherianus. Nothing about his early life or education is known, nor where he and his brother acquired Greek. He probably arrived in Constantinople, the capital of the Byzantine Empire, with his brother around 1160. They were certainly there when the controversy around Demetrius of Lampe broke out in 1166. They were not the first Pisan translators with knowledge of Greek to live in Constantinople; Burgundio of Pisa had gone before.

Leo is attested between 1171 and 1182 as a translator and interpreter in the Byzantine chancery. He bore the Latin title imperialis aule interpres (translator of the imperial court) or imperalium epistolarum interpres (translator of imperial letters). He accompanied Manuel II on his campaign against the Sultanate of Rum in 1173–1176, culminating in his defeat in the Battle of Myriokephalon. He used his influence at court in 1177 to secure his brother's freedom after the latter was imprisoned by the tax collector Astaforte.

In 1176, Leo sent his brother a translation of the Oneirocriticon of Achmet, a treatise on oneiromancy. For this work he acknowledged the assistance of his nephew Fabrizio. He was not the only westerner interested in magic and the occult in Constantinople at the time. Pascalis Romanus wrote his Liber thesauri occulti in 1165 based on the ancient Greek Oneirocritica and in 1169 made a translation of the Cyranides. One copy of the Liber thesauri occulti was even expanded with material from Leo's Oneirocriticon. Leo's translation circulated widely in manuscript and was translated and printed in Italian (1546) and French (1552).

In the latter half of the 1170s, Leo wrote a treatise on the heresies and prevarications of the Greeks, De haeresibus et praevaricationibus Graecorum, related in content to his brother's theological writings. The first part, which details the errors of the Greek church, was used by the anonymous Dominican author of the Tractatus contra Graecos (1252). The second part, which lists twelve reasons for the East–West Schism, was summarized by the Dominican Humbert of Romans (died 1277).

In 1177 or 1178, Leo translated the liturgy of John Chrysostom at the request of the Aragonese ambassador Ramon de Montcada, who was in Constantinople to negotiate the marriage of Count Ramon Berenguer III of Provence and Manuel's daughter, Eudokia Komnene. A copy of Leo's translation was acquired by William of Aversa, archbishop of Otranto, and brought to Italy before 1198. His interest piqued, William then asked Nicholas of Otranto to translate for him the liturgy of Saint Basil.

Leo survived the Massacre of the Latins in April 1182. On 7 December 1182, Pope Lucius III wrote a letter informing him of his brother's death in Italy. He sent the letter with Fabrizio and asked Leo to give him details of the massacre. There is no further information about Leo (who must have received the letter in early 1183) and it is unknown if he died in Constantinople or if he ever returned to Italy.

== Bibliography ==
- Brand, Charles M. (1991). "Leo Tuscus". In Kazhdan, Alexander (ed.). The Oxford Dictionary of Byzantium. Oxford and New York: Oxford University Press. ISBN 0-19-504652-8.
- Dondaine, Antoine (1952). "Hugues Ethérien et Léon Toscan". Archives d'histoire doctrinale et littéraire du Moyen Âge. 19: 67–134. JSTOR 44403032.
- Haskins, Charles H. (1918). "Leo Tuscus". The English Historical Review. 33 (132): 492–496. JSTOR 550921.
- Haskins, Charles H. (1924). "Leo Tuscus". Byzantinische Zeitschrift. 24 (1): 43–47. doi:10.1515/byzs.1924.24.1.43.
- Magdalino, Paul (1993). The Empire of Manuel I Komnenos, 1143–1180. Cambridge: Cambridge University Press.
- Mavroudi, Maria (2002). A Byzantine Book on Dream Interpretation: The Oneirocriticon of Achmet and Its Arabic Sources. Leiden: Brill.
- Rigo, Antonio (2005). "Leone Toscano". Dizionario Biografico degli Italiani (in Italian). Vol. 64: Latilla–Levi Montalcini. Rome: Istituto dell'Enciclopedia Italiana. ISBN 978-88-12-00032-6.
