= Pascalis Romanus =

12th-century priest, medical expert, and dream theorist

Pascalis Romanus (or Paschal the Roman) was a 12th-century priest, medical expert, and dream theorist, noted especially for his Latin translations of Greek texts on theology, oneirocritics, and related subjects. An Italian working in Constantinople, he served as a Latin interpreter for Emperor Manuel I Komnenos.

== Oneirocriticism ==
Pascalis compiled the Liber thesauri occulti, a Latin book on dream interpretation, in 1165 but appears not to have completed it himself. The second book and the first part of the third were translated or adapted from the Oneirocriticon of Achmet and the classical Oneirocritica of Artemidoros. His are the earliest known Latin translations of excerpts from Artemidoros. In the first part of the work, Pascalis also draws on Aristotle, quoting from what he refers to as the liber de naturis animalium.

Pascalis works within the dream classification system of Macrobius:

- somnium, a dream requiring interpretation
- visio, a vision that comes true
- oraculum, a prophetic dream mediated by authority
- insomnium, a false or misleading dream caused by bodily disturbance
- visum, a nightmare with supernatural contact

Elaborating on the three "true" types, Pascalis distinguishes each by the degree to which the soul achieves liberty from the body and by literary mode. In the somnium, the soul perceives the future allegorically; in the visio, historically; and in the oraculum, prophetically. The future can sometimes be revealed directly, but often dreams rely on integument, allegory, and figure. Pascalis quotes the Solomon of the occult tradition as saying:

In the multitude of dreams, there is vanity and too many words [Ecclesiastes 5:7], and dreams and vain illusions make many to err [Ecclesiasticus 34:7].

What Solomon means, Pascalis goes on to explain, is not that we should avoid the interpretation of dreams, but rather that we should recognize that littera occidit, spiritus autem vivificat ("the letter kills, but the spirit brings to life" [2 Corinthians 3:6]). Reason allows us to investigate the truth that is symbolized.

Steven Kruger has discussed the dream theory of Pascalis in the context of medical discourse, or "somatization," resulting from the introduction of new medical and scientific texts to Europe. While the Liber thesauri occulti draws on the tradition of humors, Pascalis goes beyond the connection Macrobius makes between insomnium and hunger or thirst to offer an elaborate psychosomatics. Where Macrobius had explained the visum in terms of an incubus, Pascalis offers a complex medical explanation involving blood circulation, the bodily position of the sleeper, and humoral disposition.

== Other translations ==
In 1169, Pascalis translated the Cyranides, a Hermetic magico-medical compilation. In his preface, he summarized his method:

I have striven faithfully to make [my translation] as good as the Greek book throughout, by picking up not the words, which are [in themselves] of a barbarous sterility, but rather the sense, which is useful.

Other Latin translations from Greek by Pascalis include the Ystoria Beate Virginis Marie by the 8th–9th-century priest and monk Epiphanios and the Disputatio contra Judaeos attributed (with difficulties of chronology) to Anastasios of Sinai.

== Editions ==
- Collin-Roset, S. "Le Liber thesauri occulti de Pascalis Romanus (Un traité d'interprétation des songes du XIIe siècle)". Archives d'histoire doctrinale et littéraire du Moyen Age 30 (1963) 111–198.

== Selected bibliography ==
- The Occult Sciences in Byzantium. Edited by Paul Magdalino and Maria Mavroudi. Geneva: La Pomme d'or, 2006. Limited preview online.
- Thomas Ricklin, Der Traum der Philosophie im 12. Jahrhundert. Traumtheorien zwischen Constantinus Africanus and Aristoteles. Leiden/Boston/Cologne 1998, esp. pp. 247–270.
