= Ibn Sirin =

Muslim scholar and dreams interpreter

Imam Abu Bakr Muhammad ibn Sirin
- Title: Ibn Sirin

Personal life
- Born: 32 AH (652/653 CE) Basra, Rashidun Caliphate (present-day Iraq)
- Died: AH 110 (12 January 728)
- Parents: Sirin al-Basri (father); Safiyya (mother)
- Era: Islamic golden age
- Notable work: Great Book of Interpretation of Dreams
- Relations: Hafsa bint Sirin (sister); Anas ibn Sirin (brother)

Religious life
- Religion: Islam
- Jurisprudence: Sunni

Muhammad Ibn Sirin (Arabic: محمد بن سيرين, romanized: Muḥammad Ibn Sirīn) (born in Basra) was an Arab Muslim tabi' as he was a contemporary of Anas ibn Malik. He is claimed by some to have been an interpreter of dreams, though others regard the books to have been falsely attributed to him. Once regarded as the same person as Achmet son of Seirim, this is no longer believed to be true, as shown by Maria Mavroudi.

== Biography ==
According to Yehia Gouda's reference book on Muslim oneiromancy Dreams and Their Meanings (ISBN 0-533-08877-1, published in 1991), Abu Bakr Muhammad Ibn Sirin Al-Ansari (33-110 AH; 654–728), was born in Basra, as mentioned, in 654, i.e., the 33rd year after Muhammad's leaving from Makkah to the then Medina. His birth came two years before the end of the rule of Caliph Uthman ibn Affan.

Muhammad's father (the name Abu Bakr was seldom used) was one the Christian Arab teenagers belonging to the tribes of al-Namir taken by Khalid ibn al-Walid after the Battle of Ayn al-Tamr.He was a coppersmith from a town called Jirjaya (Gerzhiya) (Arabic: جرجرايا, south east of Baghdad), settled and working there, where a decisive battle took place in year 12. According to the Encyclopedia of Islam (London; Leiden & E.J. Brill, 1971), vol. 3, p. 947, Ibn Sirin's mother, Safiyya – a servant of the caliph Abu Bakr – was held in such esteem within the community that when she died, her laying-out was performed by three of Muhammad's wives and eighteen Badris (veterans of the battle of Badr), led by Ubay ibn Ka'b, were present at her burial. 'Umar sent him as a present, either directly to Anas ibn Malik (one of the most authoritative sources on the life and opinions expressed by Muhammad) or first to a man called Talha Al-Bukhari (from Bukhara, Central Asia) who, in turn, gave him to Anas.

== Works ==
The most notable of the books attributed to him is Dreams and Interpretations. Ibn Al-Nadim says that he was the author of Taabir Al-Ro'oya (Interpretation of Dreams), which is different from or an abridged version of Muntakhabul Kalam Fi Tafsir El Ahlam (A Concise Guide for the Interpretation of Dreams) first printed in Bulaq, Egypt, in 1284 AH, in Lucknow in 1874 and in Bombay in 1296 AH. It was subsequently reprinted numerous times in various parts of the Arab World under different titles.

The rare second edition in Italian of his interpretation of Egyptian and Persian dreams was translated from Leo Toscano's Latin into Italian by the famous cheiromantist Patricio Tricasso, who, in his foreword to Alessandro Bicharia, explains that he has omitted many of the original interpretations owing to many dreams being inspired either by melancholy or evil spirits. The original Arabic, Greek and Toscano's Latin texts seem not to have survived and this is the second of three Italian editions of the sixteenth century, the others appearing in 1525 and 1551.

== See also ==
- Psychology in medieval Islam

== Sources ==
- "Ibn Sīrīn". Encyclopaedia of Islam (First ed.). doi:10.1163/2214-871X_ei1_SIM_3072. ISBN 978-90040-82-65-6.
- Fahd, T. (1960–2005). "Ibn Sīrīn". The Encyclopaedia of Islam, Second Edition (12 vols.). Leiden: E. J. Brill. doi:10.1163/1573-3912_islam_SIM_3382.
- Yücel, Ahmet (1999). "İBN SÎRÎN". TDV Encyclopedia of Islam, Vol. 20 (İbn Haldûn – İbnü'l-Cezerî) (in Turkish). Istanbul: Presidency of Religious Affairs, Centre for Islamic Studies. pp. 358–359. ISBN 978-975-389-447-0.
