= Demetrios Chloros =

Byzantine astrologer

Demetrios Chloros (Greek: Δημήτριος Χλωρός) was a 14th-century Byzantine physician, astrologer, priest and sorcerer who was tried for possessing magic books.

Chloros was a protonotarios, or secretary of the patriarch, and former kanstresios, supervisor of offerings. He was put on trial by the patriarchate of Constantinople because he had transcribed texts with content pertaining to magical practices, including the Coeranis, a portion or all of the Cyranides, and a notebook of invocations and spells he had compiled himself, suggesting he had access to various grimoires. Chloros defended the texts on the basis of their medical value. Other physicians who were witnesses against him called Chloros a disgrace to the art of medicine and said he insulted Hippocrates and Galen by regarding them as magicians. Chloros was subsequently sentenced to live as a monk under surveillance in the monastery of the Peribleptos.

Chloros is known to have vacillated between Orthodoxy and Catholicism. The synodal decree that condemned him gives equal weight to recounting his ecclesiastic career and his movements between Constantinople and the papal court. Since other churchmen advertised themselves as knowledgeable occult practitioners, the mere possession of magic texts is not likely to have been the true or primary cause of action against him.

Evidence in a later case against a physician named Gabrielopoulos included the discovery at his home of a book of spells by Chloros and the Cyranides. Chloros's notebook was said to be "filled with all manner of impiety including incantations, chants, and names of demons."

== Selected bibliography ==
- Copenhaver, Brian P. "Magic." In The Cambridge History of Science. Cambridge University Press, 2006, vol. 3, limited preview online. Full text downloadable.
- Greenfield, Richard P.H. "A Contribution to the Study of Paleologan Magic." p. 151, full text downloadable. Also published in The Occult Sciences in Byzantium (La Pomme d'or, 2006), limited preview online.
- Mavroudi, Maria. "Occult Science and Society in Byzantium: Considerations for Future Research." University of California, Berkeley. Full text downloadable. Also published in The Occult Sciences in Byzantium (La Pomme d'or, 2006).
