= Berkadzor fuel depot explosion =

2023 explosion in Berkadzor, Nagorno-Karabakh

- Date: 25 September 2023
- Time: c. 19:00 (UTC+4)
- Location: Berkadzor, Nagorno-Karabakh
- Type: Explosion
- Deaths: 218
- Injuries: 120+
- Missing: 21

On 25 September 2023, at about 19:00 (UTC+4), an explosion occurred at a military fuel depot in Berkadzor near Stepanakert, in the region of Nagorno-Karabakh, resulting in the deaths of at least 218 people and 120 injuries. The explosion occurred amidst the chaotic exodus of Armenians from Nagorno-Karabakh to Armenia, following a major military offensive launched by Azerbaijan against the unrecognized Republic of Artsakh.

== Explosion ==
The explosion occurred during the expulsion of Armenians from Nagorno-Karabakh, following Azerbaijan's large-scale military offensive launched a week earlier against the self-declared Republic of Artsakh. Prior to the offensive, the region had been subjected to a months-long blockade by Azerbaijan, causing shortages of essential supplies, including fuel.

On the morning of September 25, the Nagorno-Karabakh Information Center announced that all citizens wishing to move from the region to the Republic of Armenia would be given such an opportunity, and that starting at 2:00 PM, they would be provided with free fuel at five gas stations in Stepanakert. During the day, it also became known that large traffic jams had formed in the areas around gas stations in order to obtain fuel. After the offensive, petrol stations became overwhelmed by the volume of people seeking to leave the region. At the moment of the explosion, hundreds of people were gathered at the fuel depot.

Samvel Shahramanyan, the president of the de-facto Republic of Nagorno-Karabakh, said that the blast was caused by a violation of safety rules in the underground depot that was used for storage of gasoline for the local military.

== Reactions ==
Following the explosion, nearly 300 people were admitted to hospitals. Local authorities requested urgent medical aid from Armenia, citing Stepanakert's local strained hospitals being unable to provide adequate care. Armenia initiated an airlift using helicopters, sending doctors to the region and evacuating injured patients to Armenia. Azerbaijan also sent medical supplies.

According to Al Jazeera's correspondent in the Azerbaijani city of Horadiz, local hospitals in Azerbaijan were prepared, and negotiations began for evacuating the injured, but representatives of the Armenian residents of Nagorno-Karabakh declined the proposal.

Adrienne Watson, a spokesperson for the United States National Security Council, offered condolences for the victims and urged the need for humanitarian access to the region.

Turkey's Ministry of Foreign Affairs offered condolences to the victims of the explosion and expressed Turkey's willingness to provide assistance.
