= Manuel Opsaras Dishypatos =

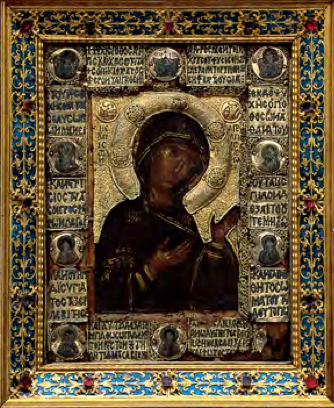
The Freising icon of the Panagia Hagiosoritissa

Manuel Opsaras Dishypatos or Disypatos (Greek: Μανουὴλ Ὀψαρᾶς Δισύπατος) was the metropolitan of Thessalonica between 1258 and 1260/61.

In 1258, he allegedly prophesied the rise to the imperial throne of Michael VIII Palaiologos (r. 1259–1282), but in 1260 or 1261 he was deposed from his see as a supporter of Patriarch Arsenios Autoreianos, who opposed Michael's sidelining of the legitimate emperor, John IV Laskaris (r. 1258–1261). Dishypatos was banished and remained in exile probably until his death; he was still alive in 1275/76. He may be identical to the deacon and kanstresios who donated an icon of the Panagia Hagiosoritissa held since 1440 in the Freising Cathedral. Dishypatos also composed the 14-verse dedicatory poem inscribed on the icon's silver-gilt revetment.

== Sources ==
- Kazhdan, Alexander, ed. (1991). The Oxford Dictionary of Byzantium. Oxford and New York: Oxford University Press. ISBN 0-19-504652-8.
- Trapp, Erich; Beyer, Hans-Veit; Walther, Rainer; Sturm-Schnabl, Katja; Kislinger, Ewald; Leontiadis, Ioannis; Kaplaneres, Sokrates (1976–1996). Prosopographisches Lexikon der Palaiologenzeit (in German). Vienna: Verlag der Österreichischen Akademie der Wissenschaften. ISBN 3-7001-3003-1.
