= Berkadzor =

Berkadzor Բերքաձոր
- Location within Azerbaijan
- Coordinates: 39°52′34″N 46°46′54″E
- Country: Azerbaijan
- Region: Nagorno-Karabakh
- District: Khojaly
- Founded: 1998
- Elevation: 619 m (2,031 ft)

Population (2015)
  - Total: 195
- Time zone: UTC+4 (AZT)

Berkadzor (Armenian: Բերքաձոր) is a village in the Khojaly District of Azerbaijan, in the region of Nagorno-Karabakh. Until 2023 it was controlled by the breakaway Republic of Artsakh. The village had an ethnic Armenian-majority population until the expulsion of the Armenian population of Nagorno-Karabakh by Azerbaijan following the 2023 Azerbaijani offensive in Nagorno-Karabakh. The village was founded in 1998.

== History ==
During the Soviet period, the area around the village was a part of the Askeran District of the Nagorno-Karabakh Autonomous Oblast. On 25 September 2023, amid the exodus of ethnic Armenians from the region, a fuel depot in Berkadzor exploded, resulting in the deaths of at least 170 people and over 300 injuries. The village is also known as Armenabad. Historical heritage sites in and around the village include tombs from the 2nd–1st millennia BCE.

On 25 September 2023, a fuel depot in Berkadzor, on the Stepanakert–Askeran road, exploded as crowds gathered for fuel during the exodus from Nagorno-Karabakh. Armenia's Investigative Committee put the death toll at 218 in December 2023, higher than the figure of at least 170 reported soon after the blast, and 22 to 23 people were still listed as missing a year later. The explosion is covered in a separate article, Berkadzor fuel depot explosion. The village had 165 inhabitants in 2005, and 195 inhabitants in 2015.

== Economy and culture ==
The population is mainly engaged in agriculture and animal husbandry, as well as in different state institutions. As of 2015, the village has a municipal building, a house of culture, a school, two shops, and a medical centre.
