= Artemon of Miletus =

Ancient Greek writer of the 1st century

Artemon (Ancient Greek: Ἀρτέμων) of Miletus was a relatively well-known writer of ancient Greece on the interpretation of dreams and on incubation cures. He lived around the middle of the first century CE, and was said to have written during the reign of the Roman emperor Nero.

He is most well known for his work the Oneirocritica (ὀνειροκριτικά), in twenty-two books, which is now lost. This work was said to have been one of the works relied upon by the later writer Artemidorus, to compile his own book titled Oneirocritica. Artemon's method of compiling the dreams for his collection was to record accounts of allegedly fulfilled dreams, often or exclusively by people sleeping in sacred spaces. Artemon's work differed from that of Artemidorus in that Artemon had greater emphasis on dreams more about the recent past than the future, and the syncretic deity Serapis (a then-popular miracle cult) figured more prominently as a presence.

He may have had a son named Neon, owing to a surviving temple inscription at Miletus, dating from the time of the emperor Caligula, describing "Neon, son of Artemon of Miletus, Friend of Gaius" that may refer to this Artemon, or to another of this name.
