= Etheria =

Etheria may refer to:

- Etheria: Ang Ikalimang Kaharian ng Encantadia, a Filipino sword and sorcery-themed live-action TV series
- Etheria (bivalve), a genus of freshwater mollusc in Africa and Madagascar
- Etheria, fictional planet in the animated series She-Ra: Princess of Power
- Egeria (pilgrim), a female pilgrim from the late fourth century
- an Ethereum-based project developed around 2015 that utilized NFTs
- the Etheria Film Night film festival showcase of new horror, science fiction, fantasy, action, and thriller films directed by women

== See also ==
- Etherian (disambiguation)
