= Preemptive arrest =

A preemptive arrest is one in which a person is arrested prior to committing a crime. Preemptive arrests are sometimes viewed with suspicion as being contrary to the principles of a democracy.

== See also ==
- Administrative detention
- Arbitrary arrest and detention
- Mass arrest
- Pre-crime
- Preventive detention
