= Why Are There No Armenians In Nagorno-Karabakh =

2024 report by Freedom House

Why Are There No Armenians in Nagorno-Karabakh? is a 2024 report conducted and published by the non-governmental organization Freedom House that examines the consequences of military actions and Azerbaijan's policies toward the ethnic Armenian population of Nagorno-Karabakh. The report states that Azerbaijan conducted a deliberate campaign of ethnic cleansing against the Armenians in the region, resulting in the end of a millennia-old Armenian presence in Nagorno-Karabakh.

The study was conducted by researchers from Freedom House, in collaboration with six partner organizations specializing in field research and documentation of war crimes.

== Background ==
The Nagorno-Karabakh region was disputed between Azerbaijan and the breakaway Republic of Artsakh, which had an ethnic Armenian population and was supported by neighbouring Armenia, until the dissolution of Republic of Artsakh on 28 September 2023. Between 19 and 20 September 2023, Azerbaijan launched a large-scale military offensive against the self-declared breakaway state of Artsakh. The offensive and subsequent surrender resulted in a flight of Nagorno-Karabakh Armenians, in which nearly the entire population of Nagorno-Karabakh fled the region for neighboring countries, primarily Armenia.

== Definition of the ethnic cleansing ==
The Final Report of the Commission of Experts established pursuant to Security Council Resolution 780 defined ethnic cleansing as:

a purposeful policy designed by one ethnic or religious group to remove by violent and terror-inspiring means the civilian population of another ethnic or religious group from certain geographic areas", [noting that in the former Yugoslavia] " 'ethnic cleansing' has been carried out by means of murder, torture, arbitrary arrest and detention, extra-judicial executions, rape and sexual assaults, confinement of civilian population in ghetto areas, forcible removal, displacement and deportation of civilian population, deliberate military attacks or threats of attacks on civilians and civilian areas, and wanton destruction of property. Those practices constitute crimes against humanity and can be assimilated to specific war crimes. Furthermore, such acts could also fall within the meaning of the Genocide Convention.

The Freedom House report concluded that Azerbaijan's actions against the Armenians of Nagorno-Karabakh constituted ethnic cleansing as understood in the context of the former Yugoslavia conflict.

== Key points ==
The report accuses Azerbaijani President Ilham Aliyev and his government of committing war crimes and crimes against humanity directed at the civilian Armenian population of Nagorno-Karabakh. According to the research, the Azerbaijani military's assault on Nagorno-Karabakh in September 2023 was the culmination of a years-long campaign in which civilians were subjected to violence, and perpetrators acted with complete impunity. The report asserts that Azerbaijan's actions constitute ethnic cleansing, with forced displacement used as a method of removal.

The report also highlights instances of the destruction of cultural landmarks, including Armenian churches, cemeteries, and residential areas in Nagorno-Karabakh after the region came fully under Azerbaijani control.

== Testimonies of Nagorno-Karabakh Armenians ==
The report also includes over three hundred testimonies from ethnic Armenians from Nagorno-Karabakh who survived the attacks.

On December 12, 2022, the Azerbaijani government began a blockade of Nagorno-Karabakh, sending individuals who claimed to be eco-activists to block the Lachin Corridor—a humanitarian route that connected Nagorno-Karabakh with Armenia and the outside world. The blockade led to a humanitarian crisis in the region. One testimony from Nagorno-Karabakh describes the conditions of hunger during the blockade: "People were starving, fainting in line for bread. It was very hard to survive. We thought that in the end, we would all just die of hunger."

During the Azerbaijani forces' attack on Nagorno-Karabakh in 2023, one testimony recounts how, as a result of shelling in the village of Sarnakhpur, five civilians were killed, including three children.

By the end of September 2023, 100,400 Armenians had fled Nagorno-Karabakh, which made up 99% of the remaining Armenian population in the region. By November 2023, only a few dozen Armenians remained in Nagorno-Karabakh. The report also includes testimonies about persecution and abuse by Azerbaijani soldiers during the exodus of the Armenian population. According to refugees, the soldiers chased them, beat them, and stole their personal belongings, while insulting them and demanding that they leave the region:

"[They] turned up their music loud, yelled something at us, insulted us with finger gestures and told us: 'Leave, leave!'"
