= Kanstresios =

The kanstresios (Greek: κανστρήσιος) was an official of the Orthodox patriarchate of Constantinople during the Byzantine Empire. Ranked between a protonotarios and a referendarios, he supervised offerings.

Those who have held the post include Manuel Dishypatos of the order of the Levites (probably to be identified with Manuel Opsaras Dishypatos, Metropolitan of Thessaloniki from 1258) and Demetrios Chloros (14th century).

The title is not to be confused with the kastresios, which was a court office related to the provisioning of the palace and the imperial table, usually held by eunuchs.
