= Tilekmat Kudaibergen uluu =

Kyrgyz political activist

Tilekmat Kudaibergen uulu (also known as Tilekmat Kurenov) is a Kyrgyz political activist environmental advocate, and government critic known for his opposition to the administration of Sadyr Japarov and for his activism related to constitutional reform, corruption, and the Kempir-Abad reservoir dispute.

== First protests and imprisonment ==
Kudaibergen uulu came to prominence in 2020 through public criticism of the Kyrgyz government's handling of the COVID-19 pandemic, allegations of high-level corruption, and environmental policies.

In 2021, he opposed proposed constitutional reforms backed by President Japarov that expanded presidential powers in Kyrgyzstan. In March 2021, Kudaibergen uulu was arrested for organizing a peaceful rally against the constitutional changes in Bishkek and was later convicted on charges including "public calls for violent seizure of power," "attempted mass riots," and "attempt to bribe voters."

He was sentenced to 18 months in prison and released in September 2022 after serving his sentence. Following his release, Kudaibergen uulu joined the Kempir-Abad Defence Committee, a coalition of civil society activists opposing a Kyrgyz government plan to transfer territorial rights over the Kempir-Abad Reservoir to Uzbekistan.

== Alleged seizure of power case ==
=== Fugitive ===
In January 2024, Kyrgyz authorities placed Kudaibergen uulu on a wanted list and accused him and businessman Imamidin Tashov of planning an illegal seizure of power. According to the Kyrgyz State Committee for National Security, dozens of alleged associates of Kudaibergen uulu and Tashov were detained or questioned across Kyrgyzstan in connection with the investigation. Kyrgyz security officials alleged that Kudaibergen uulu and Tashov had discussed organizing nationwide rallies intended to overthrow the government, claims that were publicized through state security statements and video footage released online.

=== Detention in Dubai ===
On November 12, 2024, Kudaibergen uulu traveled to Dubai to meet former Kyrgyz parliament member Emil Jamgyrchiyev, who reportedly claimed to be organizing a gathering of opposition figures.

After Jamgyrchiyev abruptly departed the United Arab Emirates, Kudaibergen uulu discovered that his passport was missing and reported the matter to Dubai police.

On November 18, 2024, Dubai police detained Kudaibergen uulu following what activists described as a false denunciation alleging drug possession. Police tests found no evidence of narcotics, and Kudaibergen uulu was informed during questioning that Kyrgyzstan had submitted an extradition request seeking his return. He was released after approximately 24 hours but remained unable to leave the United Arab Emirates because he lacked a passport.

Kudaibergen uulu was again detained in Dubai in January and March 2025 on allegations related to fraud and migration violations, though he was released each time after authorities determined the accusations lacked evidence.

On April 10, 2025, Kudaibergen uulu disappeared in Dubai after last being seen near Al Rahim Mosque in Dubai Marina. His phone and internet activity ceased later that evening, and his whereabouts remained unknown for several days.

In a later letter to his family, Kudaibergen uulu stated that he had been detained by officers of the United Arab Emirates Criminal Investigation Department on April 10, 2025. He alleged that after his detention he was held for eight days in a basement by unidentified individuals without access to legal counsel or formal extradition proceedings. Kudaibergen uulu further alleged that on April 18, 2025, he was forcibly transported from Abu Dhabi to Kyrgyzstan aboard a private aircraft outside any official legal process.

=== Detention in Kyrgyzstan ===
On April 19, 2025, Kyrgyz state media confirmed that Kudaibergen uulu had been detained in Bishkek and charged with public calls for violent seizure of power, an offense punishable by up to 15 years in prison under Kyrgyz law. He was subsequently charged with inciting mass riots and incitement of racial, ethnic, national, religious, or interregional hatred.

The Kyrgyz State Committee for National Security alleged that while abroad, Kudaibergen uulu had regularly published provocative social media posts calling for unrest and the violent overthrow of the government.

On April 21, 2025, the Pervomaisky District Court of Bishkek ordered that he remain in pre-trial detention pending investigation.

In February 2026, after approximately ten months in pre-trial detention, criminal proceedings against Kudaibergen uulu formally began in Kyrgyzstan.
