= Cyranides =

Ancient Greek text on magic and medicine

The Cyranides (Greek: Κυρανίδες; also Kyranides or Kiranides) is a compilation of ancient Greek works on magic and medicine first put together in the 4th century. Latin and Arabic translations also exist. It has been described as a "farrago" and a texte vivant, owing to the complexities of its transmission: it has been abridged, rearranged, and supplemented. The resulting compilation covers the magical properties and practical uses of gemstones, plants, and animals, and is a virtual encyclopedia of amulets; it also contains material pertinent to the history of western alchemy, and to New Testament studies, particularly in illuminating meanings of words and magico-religious practices. As a medical text, the Cyranides was held in relatively low esteem even in antiquity and the Middle Ages because of its use of vernacular language and reliance on lore rather than Hippocratic or Galenic medical theory.

In the Pseudodoxia Epidemica, Thomas Browne described the Cyranides as "a collection out of Harpocration the Greek and sundry Arabick writers delivering not only the Naturall but Magicall propriety of things." Although the Cyranides was considered "dangerous and disreputable" in the Middle Ages, it was translated into Latin by Pascalis Romanus, a clergyman with medical expertise who was the Latin interpreter for Emperor Manuel I Komnenos. The 14th-century cleric Demetrios Chloros was put on trial because he transcribed magical texts, including what was referred to as the Coeranis.

== Form and structure ==
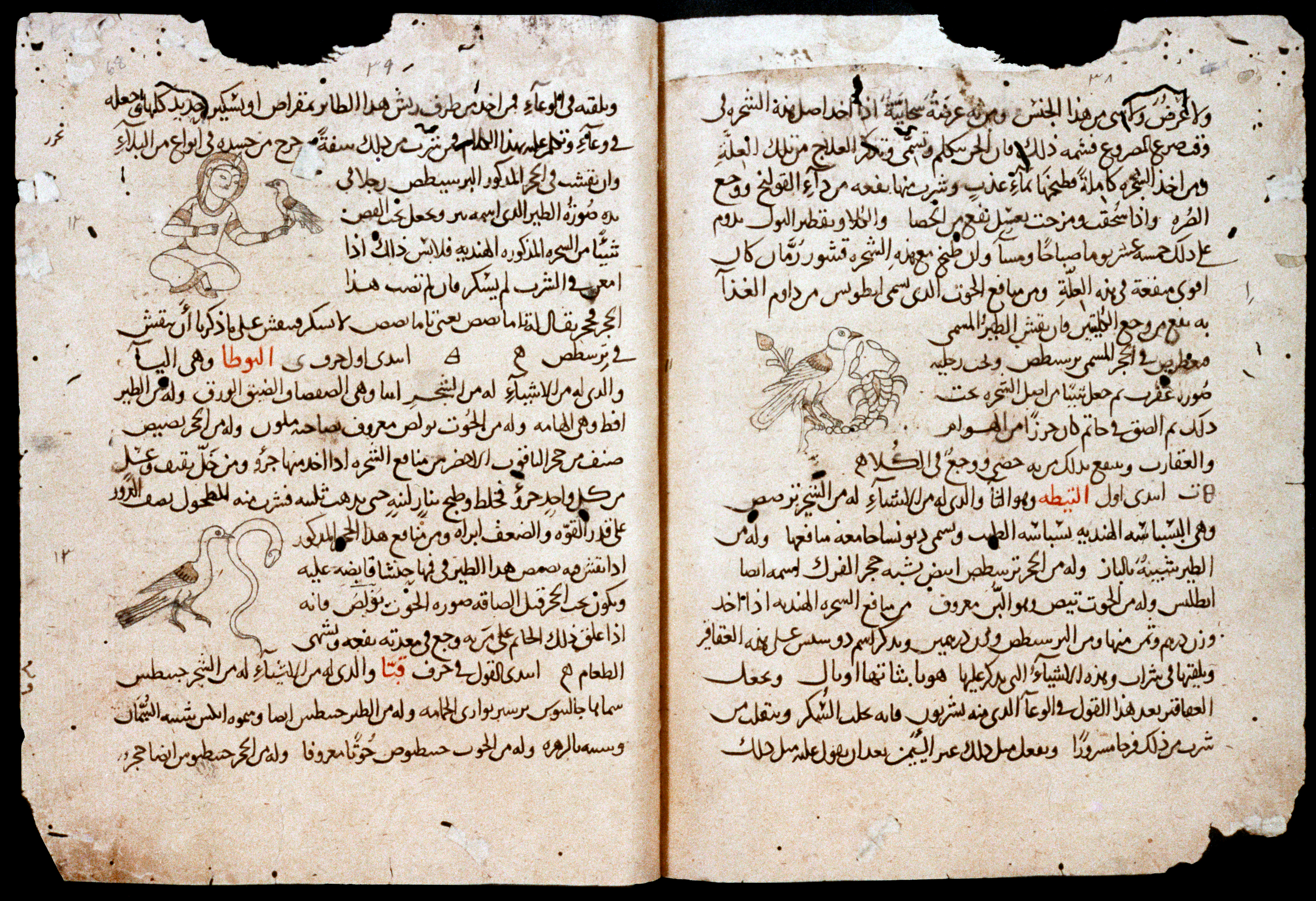
14th-century Arabic manuscript of the Cyranides

The original 4th-century Cyranides comprised three books, to which a redactor added a fourth. The original first book of the Cyranides, the Kyranis (Κυρανίς), was the second component of a two-part work, the first part of which was the Archaikê (Ἀρχαϊκἠ). Books 2–4 are a bestiary. The edition of Kaimakis (see below) contains a fifth and sixth book which were not transmitted under the name Cyranides but which were included with the work in a limited number of manuscripts. A medieval Arabic translation of the first book exists, and portions of it are "reflected" in the Old French work Le livre des secrez de nature (The Book of Nature's Secrets).

The Cyranides begins by instructing the reader to keep its contents secret, and with a fictional narrative of how the work was discovered. In one 15th-century manuscript, the author of the work is said to be Kyranos (Κοίρανος), king of Persia.

== Sample remedies and spells ==
The Cyranides devotes a chapter to the healing powers of the water snake; its bezoar is used to cure dropsy. Fish gall is recommended for healing white spots in the eye; fish liver is supposed to cure blindness. For a "large and pleasurable" erection, a mixture of arugula, spices, and honey is recommended, as is carrying the tail of a lizard or the right molar of a skink. The fumigation or wearing of bear hair turns away evil spirits and fever.

Daniel Ogden, a specialist in magic and the supernatural in antiquity, has gathered several references from the Cyranides on the use of gemstones and amulets. The collection offers spells to avert the child-harming demon Gello, who was blamed for miscarriages and infant mortality, and says that aetite can be worn as an amulet against miscarriage.

== Magico-religious tradition ==
Olympidorus provides a summary of a passage from the work, not part of the abridged version now extant, that has cosmological as well as alchemical implications:

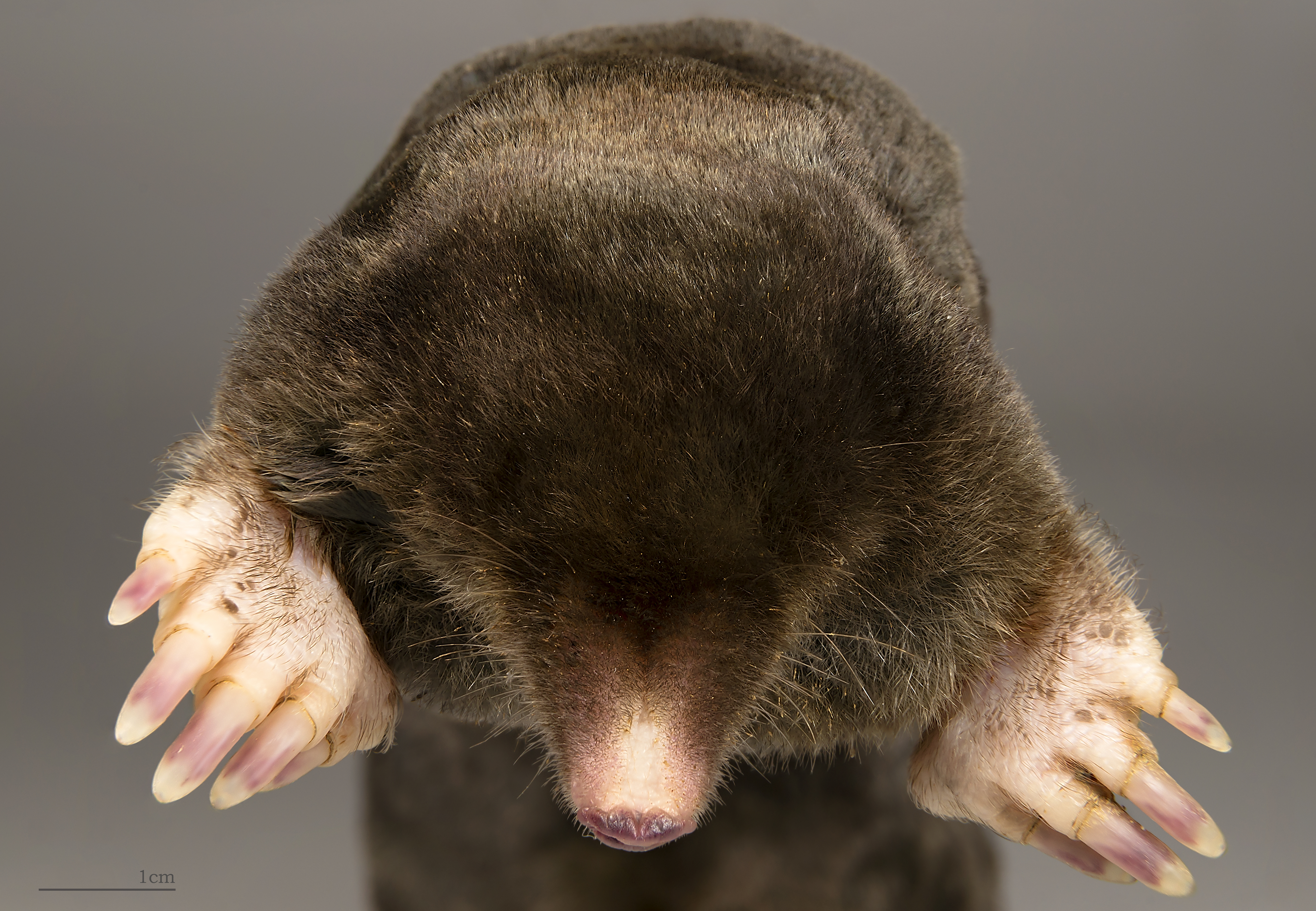
The mole: once a man, and cursed for revealing the secrets of the sun, according to the Cyranides

Again in Kyranis Hermes, speaking riddlingly of the egg, said that it is properly the substance of gold-solder and the moon. For the egg challenges the golden-haired cosmos: the cockerel, Hermes says, was once a man, cursed by the sun. This he says in the book called Ancient (archaike). In it he also makes mention of the mole, saying that it too was once a man. It was cursed by god for revealing the secrets of the sun. And the sun made it blind and if it happens to be observed by the sun, the earth does not receive it till evening. He says '<the sun made it blind> as it knew as well what was the shape of the sun.' He exiled it in the melanitis land [black earth?], as a law-breaker and divulger of his secret to the human race.

In the extant version, the Cyranides contains a description of the heliodromus, a phoenix-like bird from India which, upon hatching, flies to the rising sun and then goes west when the sun passes the zenith. It lives only a year, and, according to some interpretations of an unreliable text, leaves behind an androgynous progeny.

== Editions and translations ==
- (1685) Magick Of Kirani King Of Persia
- Delatte, Louis (1942). Textes latins et vieux français relatifs aux Cyranides. Paris: Droz. OCLC 901714095. The Latin translation.
- Kaimakis, Dimitris (1976). Die Kyraniden. Meisenheim am Glan: Hain. ISBN 9783445013347. (NB: Kaimakis did not consult the Latin text while making this edition).
- Ruelle, M. Ch.-Ém. (1898). Les lapidaires de l'antiquité et du moyen-âge 2. Les lapidaires grecs, Tome 2, Fascicule 1. Paris. Partial Greek text.
- Toral-Niehoff, Isabel (2004). Kitab Giranis. Die arabische Übersetzung der ersten Kyranis des Hermes Trismegistos und die griechischen Parallelen. München: Herbert Utz. ISBN 3-8316-0413-4. Arabic translation and partial Greek text; Greek text contains many typographical errors.
- Ullmann, Manfred (2020). "Die arabischen Fragmente der Bücher II bis IV der Kyraniden". Studia graeco-arabica. 10: 49–58. (Arabic translation of fragments from books 2–4 of the Cyranides)
- Waegeman, Maryse (1987). Amulet and Alphabet: Magical Amulets in the First Book of Cyranides. Amsterdam: J. C. Gieben. ISBN 90-70265-80-X. OCLC 17009220. English translation and commentary on select passages from Book 1.

== Selected bibliography ==
- Bain, David. "Μελανῖτις γῆ in the Cyranides and Related Texts: New Evidence for the Origins and Etymology of Alchemy." In Magic in the Biblical World: From the Rod of Aaron to the Ring of Solomon. T&T Clark International, 2003, pp. 191–218. Limited preview online.
- Bain, David. "περιγίνεσθαι as a Medical Term and a Conjecture in the Cyranides." In Ethics and Rhetoric: Classical Essays for Donald Russell on His Seventy-Fifth Birthday. Oxford: Clarendon Press, 1995, pp. 281–286. Limited preview online.
- Faraone, Christopher A. Ancient Greek Love Magic. Harvard University Press, 2001. Limited preview online.
- Mavroudi, Maria. "Occult Science and Society in Byzantium: Considerations for Future Research." University of California, Berkeley. Full text downloadable. Also published in The Occult Sciences in Byzantium (La Pomme d'or, 2006), limited preview online.
