= Ordre des Avocats de Guinée =

Ordre des Avocats de Guinée (Lawyer's Order of Guinea) is a body of lawyers in Guinea. The General Secretary of the Bar Council is Boubacar Sow.
