= Artemidorus of Daldis =

Greek diviner (2nd century)

Artemidorus Daldianus (Ancient Greek: Ἀρτεμίδωρος ὁ Δαλδιανός) or Ephesius was a professional diviner and dream interpreter who lived in the 2nd century AD. He is known from an extant five-volume Greek work, the Oneirocritica or Oneirokritikon (English: The Interpretation of Dreams).

== Life and work ==
Artemidorus was surnamed Ephesius, from Ephesus, on the west coast of Asia Minor, but was also called Daldianus, from his mother's native city, Daldis in Lydia. He lived in the 2nd century AD.

According to Artemidorus, the material for his work was gathered during lengthy travels through Greece, Italy and Asia, from diviners of high and low station. Another major source were the writings of Artemidorus' predecessors, sixteen of whom he cites by name. It is clear he built on a rich written tradition, now otherwise lost. Artemidorus' method is, at root, analogical. He writes that dream interpretation is "nothing other than the juxtaposition of similarities" (2.25). But like other types of Greek divination, including astrology, celestial divination and pallomancy, Greek dream divination (Oneiromancy) became exceedingly complex, a given dream subject to a number of interpretations depending on secondary considerations, such as the age, sex, and status of the dreamer. At other times, subtle distinctions within the dream itself are significant. In a particularly memorable passage, Artemidorus expounds upon the meaning of dreams involving sex with one's mother:

The case of one's mother is both complex and manifold and admits of many different interpretations—a thing not all dream interpreters have realized. The fact is that the mere act of intercourse by itself is not enough to show what is portended. Rather, the manner of the embraces and the various positions of the bodies indicate different outcomes. (Trans. Robert J. White)

There follows a lengthy and minute recitation of the divinatory significance of having sex with one's mother in various sexual positions.

The first three books of the Oneirocritica are dedicated to one Cassius Maximus, usually identified with the rhetorician Maximus of Tyre, and were intended to serve as a detailed introduction for both diviners and the general public. Books four and five were written for Artemidorus' son, also named Artemidorus, to give him a leg-up on competitors, and Artemidorus cautions him about making copies.

According to the Suda, Artemidorus also penned a Oiônoscopica (Οἰωνοσκοπικὰ) (Interpretation of Birds) and a Chiroscopica (Χειροσκοπικά) (Palmistry), but neither has survived, and the authorship is discounted. In the Oneirocritica, Artemidorus displays a hostile attitude to palmistry.

Among the authors Artemidorus cites are Antiphon (possibly the same as Antiphon the Sophist), Aristander of Telmessus, Demetrius of Phalerum, Alexander of Myndus in Caria, and Artemon of Miletus. The fragments of these authors, from Artemidorus and other sources, were collected by Del Corno in his Graecorum de re onirocritica scriptorum reliquiae (1969).

== Editions and translations ==
- The definitive edition of the Greek text is by Roger Pack, Artemidori Daldiani Onirocriticon Libri V (Teubner 1963)
- The most recent edition including Greek text (slightly revised from Pack's), English translation and commentary is: Daniel E. Harris-McCoy, Artemidorus' Oneirocritica: Text, Translation, and Commentary (Oxford: Oxford University Press, 2012). For an earlier English translation: R.J. White, The Interpretation of Dreams (2nd Edition, Torrance, CA: Original Books, 1990).
- A medieval Arabic version was made of the first three books (i.e., the "public" books) in 877 AD by Hunayn ibn Ishaq, and published by Toufic Fahd with a French introduction in 1964 under the title Le livre des songes [par] Artémidore d'Éphèse
- The most recent English translation is by Martin Hammond, The Interpretation of Dreams (Oxford World's Classics, 2020)
- The most recent Italian translation is by Dario Del Corno, Libro dei sogni (1974)
- The most recent French translation is by A. J. Festugière, Clef des Songes (1975)
- The most recent German translation is by Karl Brackertz, Artemidor von Daldis, Das Traumbuch (1979)
- There is also a Dutch translation, by Simone Mooij-Valk, called Droomboek (2003)

The "fragments" of other Greco-Roman oneirocritic authors were compiled by Dario Del Corno in his Graecorum de re Onirocritica Scriptorum Reliquiae (1969), with commentary in Italian. As many of the fragments are preserved by Artemidorus, Del Corno's work is also a partial commentary to the Oneirocritica.

== Relevant literature ==
- Hahn, István (1985). Álomfejtés és társadalmi valóság. Artemidorus Daldianus mint társadalomtörténeti forrás [Dreaming and social reality. Artemidorus Daldianus as a source of social history]. Budapest.
  - German translation: Traumdeutung und gesellschaftliche Wirklichkeit: Artemidorus Daldianus als sozialgeschichtliche Quelle. Konstanz: Universitätsverlag Konstanz.
- Pack, Roger A. "On Artemidorus and his Arabic translator." In Transactions and Proceedings of the American Philological Association 98, pp. 313-326.
- Thonemann, Peter (2020). An ancient dream manual. Artemidorus' The interpretation of dreams. Oxford: Oxford University Press.
- Weber, Gregor (2015). Artemidor von Daldis und die antike Traumdeutung. Texte – Kontexte – Lektüren [Artemidor of Daldis and the ancient interpretation of dreams. Texts - Contexts - Readings]. Berlin: De Gruyter.
