= Expulsion of Nagorno-Karabakh Armenians =

Mass displacement of Armenians from Nagorno-Karabakh by Azerbaijan

- Part of the Nagorno-Karabakh conflict
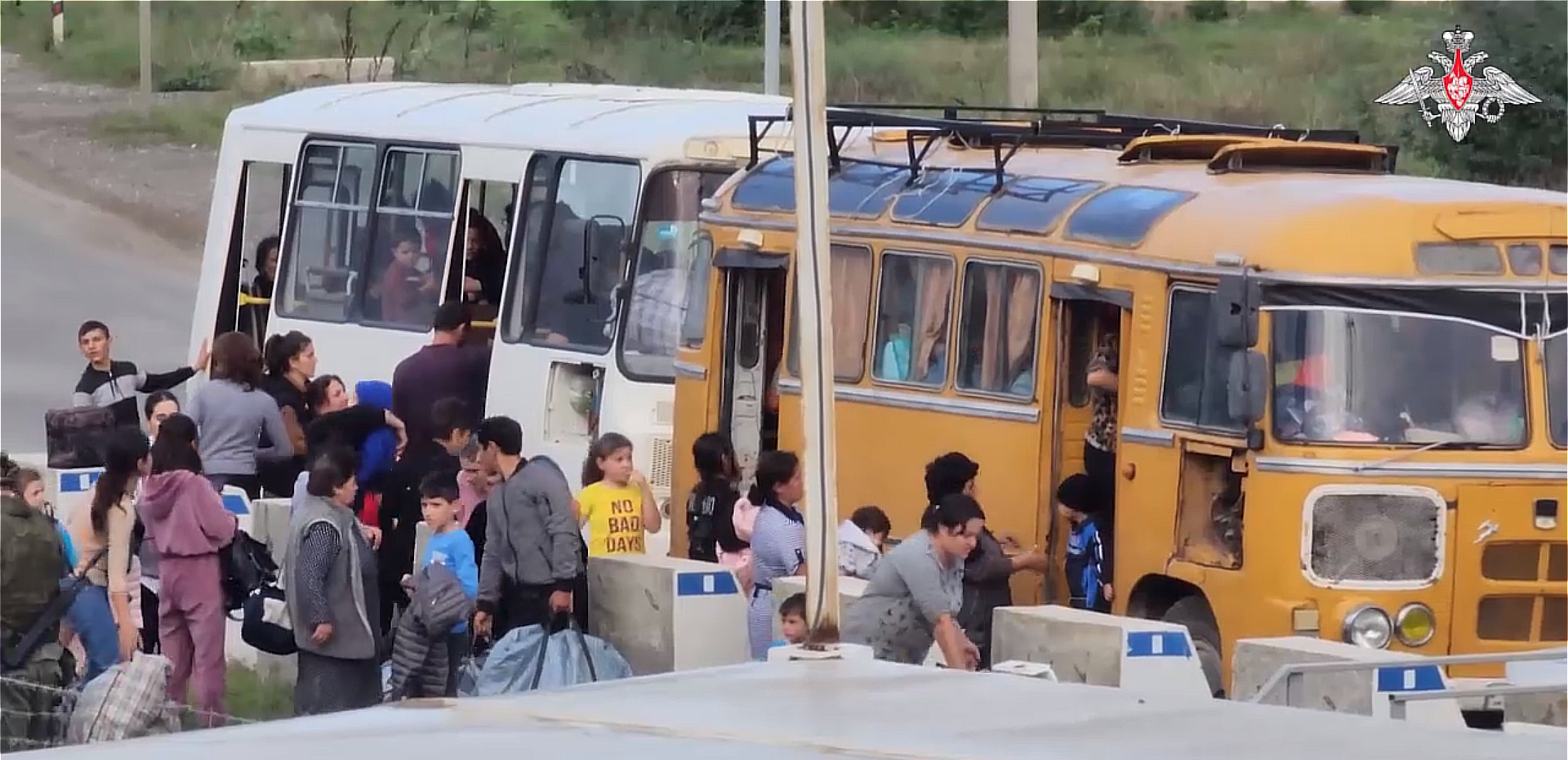
- Displaced ethnic Armenians boarding buses in Nagorno-Karabakh
- Date: 24 September 2023 – 3 October 2023 (1 week and 2 days)
- Location: Nagorno-Karabakh
- Cause: 2023 Azerbaijani offensive in Nagorno-Karabakh
- Deaths: 288 (218 from the Berkadzor fuel depot explosion, 70 en route to Armenia)
- Displaced: Over 100,617 (99% of population) as of 3 October 2023

On 19–20 September 2023, Azerbaijan initiated a military offensive in the disputed Nagorno-Karabakh region which ended with the surrender of the self-declared Republic of Artsakh, the disbandment of its armed forces and the effective expulsion of the entire population. Up until the military assault, the region was internationally recognized as part of Azerbaijan, but was governed and populated by ethnic Armenians.

Before the Second Nagorno-Karabakh War in 2020, the region had an estimated population of 150,000 which decreased in the aftermath of the war. Faced with threats of ethnic cleansing by Azerbaijan and struggling amid a nine-month long blockade, 100,400 ethnic Armenians, representing 99% of the remaining population of Nagorno-Karabakh, fled by the end of September 2023, leaving only a couple of dozen people within the region.

This mass forced displacement of people has been described by international experts as a war crime or crime against humanity. 288 civilians died while fleeing to Armenia, including 218 during an explosion at a fuel distribution center, and 70 civilians while en route to Armenia. While the Azerbaijani government issued assurances that the Armenian population would be safely reintegrated, these claims were not deemed credible due to Azerbaijan's established track record of authoritarianism and repression of its Armenian population.

== Background ==
The Nagorno-Karabakh conflict is an ethnic and territorial dispute between Armenia and Azerbaijan over the region of Nagorno-Karabakh, which is located within Azerbaijan but was, historically, predominantly inhabited by Armenians.

=== Cultural suppression during the Soviet period ===
Between 1921 and 1990, under the Azeri SSR Armenians in the region faced economic marginalization and cultural discrimination, leading to a significant exodus. Authorities encouraged the settlement of Azeris from outside Nagorno-Karabakh. This policy – sometimes called a "White Genocide" – aimed at "de-Armenizing" the territory culturally and physically and followed a similar pattern to Azerbaijan's treatment of Armenians in Nakhchivan. The suppression of Armenian language and culture was widespread: Armenian churches, cemeteries, and schools were closed or destroyed, and clerics arrested. The Armenian educational institutions that remained were under control by the Azeri Ministry of Education, which enforced prohibitions against teaching Armenian history and using Armenian materials. Restrictions limited cultural exchanges and communication between Nagorno-Karabakh and Armenia. The Azerbaijani government decreed in 1957 that Azerbaijani was to be the main language and the 1981 "law of the NKAR" denied additional rights, removing provisions that had listed Armenian as a working language of local authorities.

Resentment against what was perceived as a forced "Azerification" campaign led to a mass movement for reunification with Armenia. In February 1988, the Karabakh Movement escalated from rallies to mass strikes and civil disobedience for unification with Armenia. The regional Soviet of Nagorno-Karabakh endorsed these demands in a resolution that effectively challenged Soviet internal borders, as hundreds of thousands mobilized in the largest protest movement in the Soviet Union since its formative years in the 1920s.

In November 1991, the Azerbaijani government passed a motion to abolish the autonomy of the Nagorno-Karabakh entity and facilitate a form of culturally motivated ethnic cleansing by enforcing the exclusive use of Azerbaijani placenames for the cities of Stepanakert, Mardakert, and Martuni. In response, the Armenians of Nagorno-Karabakh held an independence referendum in 1991.

=== First and Second Nagorno-Karabakh War ===
The Karabakh movement for independence was met with a series of pogroms and forced deportations of Armenians across Azerbaijan, leading to the outbreak of the First Nagorno-Karabakh War. Azerbaijan severed transport and economic links between Armenia and Azerbaijan and between Artsakh and Armenia. The complete isolation of Artsakh from the outside world lasted for 3 years until Armenian forces opened a humanitarian corridor known as the Lachin corridor to Armenia in May 1992. The war resulted in the displacement of approximately 500,000 Azerbaijanis from Nagorno-Karabakh and the adjacent occupied territories as well as 186,000 from Armenia, and between 300,000 and 500,000 Armenians from Azerbaijan. A subsequent conflict, the Second Nagorno-Karabakh War in 2020, caused thousands of casualties and ended with a significant Azerbaijani victory. This war allowed Azerbaijan to reclaim all the territories surrounding Nagorno-Karabakh and a third of Nagorno-Karabakh itself. After the 2020 war, violations of the ceasefire in Nagorno-Karabakh and at the Armenian-Azerbaijani border persisted, resulting in sporadic casualties.

=== Blockade and capture of the region by Azerbaijan ===
For nine months (December 2022 to September 2023), Azerbaijan blocked the Lachin corridor, the only road connecting Nagorno-Karabakh to Armenia. During this period Azerbaijan also sabotaged critical civilian infrastructure of Artsakh, disrupting access to gas, electricity, and internet access. The blockade led to a humanitarian crisis for the population. In February 2023 the International Court of Justice ordered Azerbaijan to ensure free movement to Nagorno-Karabakh, ruling that the blockade posed a "real and imminent risk" to the "health and life" of Nagorno-Karabakh's Armenian population. By early September 2023 the blockade had caused supplies to all but run out; there was little medicine or fuel, while bread, a staple in the region, was rationed to one loaf per family per day.

All the above efforts have only one goal: ensure irreversible normalization of relations between Baku and Yerevan for the benefit of all populations on the ground. It is now time for courageous compromise solutions, also in light of today's escalation.

— Spokesperson of Charles Michel, President of the European Council, on 1 September 2023.

International observers, including Luis Moreno Ocampo, the inaugural prosecutor of the International Criminal Court, expressed concerns that Azerbaijan's blockade could be the onset of a genocide. Ocampo specifically stated that Azerbaijan's actions, which included withholding essential supplies like food and medicine, appeared to be a calculated effort to inflict on the Armenian population of Nagorno-Karabakh conditions of life calculated to bring about its physical destruction. In August 2023, as a direct result of the blockade, a resident of Nagorno-Karabakh died from starvation. The spokesperson for Charles Michel, President of the European Council, stated their primary goal was the irreversible normalization of Armenian-Azerbaijani relations and called for "courageous compromise solutions". The Armenian President denounced Azerbaijan, asserting it was committing genocide by causing Armenians in Nagorno-Karabakh to starve. Similarly, Ronald Grigor Suny stated, "Baku is determined to make the Armenians' lives impossible, starve them out, and pressure them to leave."

On 19 September 2023, Azerbaijan initiated an offensive in Nagorno-Karabakh, aiming to disarm the self-declared republic's military. The assault, lasting 24 hours, resulted in hundreds of casualties from both sides and the deaths of five Russian peacekeepers. After the Republic of Artsakh's government agreed to surrender terms, negotiations ensued, leading Azerbaijan to eventually reopen the road to Armenia. This move provided Armenians an avenue to evacuate the region, and a significant number began departing from 24 September onward.

== Flight ==
Prior to the Azerbaijani military offensive in Nagorno-Karabakh, there were growing concerns that Azerbaijan, with a long history of Anti-Armenian sentiment, might commit a genocide against the region's Armenians. Elchin Amirbeyov, the representative of the Azerbaijani president, predicted that "a genocide may happen" if the Republic of Artsakh did not capitulate. Echoing this concern Senator Bob Menendez, chair of the United States Senate Committee on Foreign Relations, urged for sanctions to be imposed against Azerbaijan to prevent genocide.

After the Nagorno-Karabakh defenses collapsed, the Lemkin Institute for Genocide Prevention warned of an acute risk of genocide, fueled by extreme anti-Armenian sentiment in the Azerbaijani military, while Azerbaijani social media teemed with threats, abuse, and reports of massacres of Armenians who stayed. In a concurrent announcement, Genocide Watch sounded an alert, categorizing the situation as "Stage 9 – Extermination" within their ten stages of genocide framework.

=== Absence of credible safety guarantees for integration within Azerbaijan ===
While the Azerbaijani government issued assurances that the Armenian population would be safely "reintegrated," these claims were not deemed credible due to Azerbaijan's established track record of authoritarianism and repression of its Armenian population. Noting this history, the Lemkin Institute for Genocide Prevention urged that Artsakhi women and children refuse being separated from men and older boys.

In September 2023, residents of Nagorno-Karabakh/Artsakh described integration under Azerbaijani rule as unsafe, with one report stating they "cannot conceive any form of safe reintegration into Azerbaijan," and other reporting describing fears of persecution and ethnic cleansing. Human Rights Watch reported that Azerbaijan has “not taken meaningful steps to ensure the right to return in safety and dignity” and Amnesty International stated that the displaced Armenians' right to a "safe and dignified return remained unrealized." A 2023 Parliamentary Assembly of the Council of Europe resolution linked the flight to a "genuine threat of physical extinction" and Azerbaijan's failure to reassure Armenians about their safety. A Freedom House–led fact-finding report recorded that even peacekeepers within Nagorno-Karabakh "did not feel safe." The Freedom House report states that the destruction of entire neighborhoods in Stepanakert contradicts Azerbaijan's proclaimed "reintegration plan." It also cites a video published by a news outlet linked to Azerbaijan's Ministry of Defence on the "reintegration process" that included the remark, "even a wild cat can be tamed."

=== Timeline ===
On 24 September 2023, amid fears of genocide, ethnic cleansing, and persecution, the evacuation of Armenian refugees began through the Lachin corridor, arriving in Syunik Province in the south-east of Armenia, via the Kornidzor border post. The Armenian government reported late on that day that 1,050 refugees had made their way to safety.

By the evening of 25 September, according to the Armenian government, 6,500 refugees had arrived from Nagorno-Karabakh. After enduring months of scarce fuel supply while under blockade, the arrival of a fuel shipment gave residents the opportunity to refuel their vehicles for the journey to Armenia, and on 25 September, petrol stations in Stepanakert began distributing fuel at no cost to those evacuating to Armenia. However, amidst extensive queues at a fuel station in Berkadzor, an underground 50-ton fuel tank exploded, leading to the death of at least 170 individuals and injuring hundreds of others. Most of the victims were queueing to obtain fuel for their vehicles while on their way to Armenia. Victims with various degrees of burns were treated in the Republican Medical Center of Artsakh, facilities of the Arevik community organization, medical facilities in Ivanyan, and the medical station of Russian peacekeepers. The Presidential Administration of Azerbaijan said it sent an ambulance carrying medical supplies. 142 of the injured were later brought to Armenia.

By 26 September, the Armenian government said at least 28,000 people had fled Nagorno-Karabakh, equivalent to a quarter of the region's population.

By 27 September, Armenian authorities reported that over 50,000 refugees from Nagorno-Karabakh had left for Armenia, including 17,000 children. In separate events on 27 September, Ruben Vardanyan, a former high-level Artsakh government official and a prominent businessman, was apprehended by Azerbaijani forces just as he was poised to enter Armenia, and civilian accounts from the village of Vaghuhas reported that Azerbaijani soldiers had entered the village and, discharging their firearms into the air, demanded the residents flee.

By 28 September, the tally of arrivals in Armenia surpassed 65,000, accounting for over half of the Nagorno-Karabakh's total population. The evacuation route from Stepanakert to Armenia had been clogged for days, with many forced to sleep in their cars overnight. What typically is a 2-hour drive transformed into a staggering 30-hour journey for many evacuees.

By 29 September, the number of refugees had reached 97,700. Refugees reported spending days in the evacuation queue and moving forward only a few hundred meters a day. Armenian Health Minister Anahit Avanesian said some refugees died in transit due to exhaustion brought about by malnutrition, lack of medicine, and the travel time (which took up to 40 hours).

By 30 September, the number of refugees had reached 100,400. On 2 October, the last bus carrying refugees composed of those with serious illnesses or mobility issues entered Armenia. The Armenian government stated that 100,514 of the estimated 120,000 population of Nagorno-Karabakh had been displaced as of 2 October, reaching 100,617 by noon of 3 October. The UN mission which was tasked with visiting the region, heard from interlocutors that on 1 October only 50 to 1000 Armenians were left in the entire Karabakh region.

On 19 October, the International Committee of the Red Cross (ICRC) reported that "a small number of people remain in their homes, either by choice or because they were unable to leave by themselves." The ICRC has provided food, medical care, communication services, and transportation to remaining residents.

=== Armenian support ===
To aid in the evacuation, 46 buses, usually designated for public transport in Yerevan, transported 1,560 individuals from Stepanakert to Goris in Syunik Province on 28 September. Armenia also sent 23 ambulances to Artsakh accompanied by specialists and the Red Cross, which returned transporting 23 severely injured people from Artsakh to Armenia.

In Armenia, the theatre in the city of Goris was converted into a base for the Red Cross to accommodate refugees. A secondary hub was later opened in Vayk.

=== Status of remaining residents ===
Of the couple of dozen residents who stayed behind, the majority are believed to be elderly or disabled. Azerbaijan has confiscated their passports and monitors their communications. On 23 January 2026, 11 of the last Armenians remaining in Nagorno-Karabakh were transferred to Armenia, with Armenian officials saying they had formally requested relocation, while relatives claimed they were not informed of their destination and feared for their lives during the journey. Tigran Petrosyan, an activist originally from Nagorno-Karabakh, described this as "the final act of ethnic cleansing."

== Genocide and ethnic cleansing accusations ==
Various political analysts, along with residents of Nagorno-Karabakh, accused Azerbaijan of committing ethnic cleansing. (Note: Attributed to these sources:)

Multiple scholars, (Note: Attributed to these sources:) journalists, (Note: Attributed to these sources:) legal experts, (Note: Attributed to these sources:) former UN experts, (Note: Attributed to these sources:) governments, (Note: Attributed to these sources:) and international organizations (Note: Attributed to these sources:) – including those specializing in human rights (Note: Attributed to these sources:) and genocide prevention (Note: Attributed to these sources:) – state that Azerbaijan implemented policies aimed at erasing Armenian populations and heritage in Nagorno-Karabakh. These actions meet international definitions of ethnic cleansing (Note: Attributed to these sources:) or genocide. (Note: Attributed to these sources:)

=== Legal experts and international organizations ===
Luis Moreno Ocampo, the inaugural Prosecutor of the International Criminal Court (ICC), cautioned that conditions akin to another Armenian genocide were developing, stating that Azerbaijan's blockade violated Article II c of the 1948 Genocide Convention, by "deliberately inflicting on [a] group conditions of life calculated to bring about its physical destruction in whole or in part", and that the invasion further violated Article II a and Article II b. He warned that the international community's inertia could embolden Azerbaijan, making them believe there would be no significant repercussions for committing genocide. Ocampo also countered Aliyev's denial of seeking ethnic cleansing, noting that Aliyev often labeled Armenia as "Western Azerbaijan" and proclaimed that "present-day Armenia is our land". After all Armenians had been forced out of Nagorno-Karabakh, Ocampo declared this to constitute genocide under the articles of the Genocide Convention and accused Azerbaijan of committing crimes against humanity. Ocampo also accused the United States and other international meditators of "deliberately ignoring the risk of genocide to avoid the obligation to prevent genocide".

International legal experts, Priya Pillai and Melanie O'Brien, a visiting professor at the University of Minnesota and president of the International Association of Genocide Scholars, described this mass displacement as either a war crime or crime against humanity perpetrated by Azerbaijan and accused Azerbaijan of committing genocide. This characterization is based on the created coercive environment, first through the blockade and subsequently the invasion, leading to the potential genocidal destruction of the Artsakh Armenians' distinct identity. The Lemkin Institute for Genocide Prevention also warned that the forced displacement of Armenians from Artsakh will result in them losing "their distinct identity as Artsakhsis, an identity that has been forged through centuries – millennia – of independent cultural flourishing in their mountains and valleys." The journalist Gabriel Gavin states that the Artsakhi identity will fade and that the children which fled through the Lachin corridor checkpoint "could well be the very last generation of Karabakh Armenians."

Edward Hunt, of the Foreign Policy in Focus (FPIF) think tank, accused Azerbaijan of ethnic cleansing, while also criticizing United States officials for endorsing ethnic cleansing to further their geopolitical ambitions. David Scheffer, the first United States Ambassador-at-Large for Global Criminal Justice, wrote that the Armenians of Nagorno-Karabakh were ethnically cleansed and that, after finalising its status at the ICC, Armenia could apply for the ICC investigation, and Azerbaijani political and military leaders could be drawn into the jurisdiction of the ICC.

Azerbaijan has been accused of committing ethnic cleansing against the Armenians of Nagorno-Karabakh by the European Parliament and the Council on Foreign Relations. The United Nations Refugee Agency representative in Armenia said on 29 September there were no recorded incidents or cases of mistreatment against people on the move, and in response to questions from the media, they said they could not comment on whether this constituted ethnic cleansing and that they were viewing it as a refugee situation. The USAID representative said that they were aware of "troubling reports of violence against civilians", and that testimony was being gathered from those who had fled "violence, deprivation, and with the fear of living under the government of Azerbaijan." NGOs receiving Karabakh Armenians at the Syunik border reported that the refugees "were either forced by the Azerbaijani authorities to delete their phone data before crossing the border to Armenia or had opted themselves to delete it out of fear of undermining their chances of departure."

The Council of Europe stated that it was "extremely concerned about the serious humanitarian and human rights situation in Nagorno-Karabakh." The Council of Europe Commissioner for Human Rights Dunja Mijatović visited Armenia and Azerbaijan, including the Karabakh region, from 16 to 23 October 2023, and published on 12 January 2024 her observations. Testimonies provided to the Commissioner by Karabakh Armenians reveal a deep-rooted fear for their lives and future amid armed conflicts, exacerbated by Azerbaijan's control resulting from unresolved past atrocities and ongoing intimidation. Feeling abandoned by all parties and with no security guarantees, the heightened vulnerability experienced during the blockade, and the unexpected reopening of the Lachin corridor in late September 2023, prompted Karabakh Armenians to believe that leaving the region immediately was the only option available to ensure their survival and future well-being. The Commissioner also stated that all displaced persons have the right to return to their homes, regardless of whether they have been displaced internally or across borders, and that both Armenia and Azerbaijan have the obligation to ensure that any return is voluntary, safe and dignified.

=== Politicians ===
Multiple government bodies or their representatives, including those of Canada, Cyprus, Armenia, France, European Parliament, and PACE characterized Azerbaijan's actions as ethnic cleansing.

Azerbaijani officials have denied war crimes accusations including ethnic cleansing and responded by urging Armenians to stay in the region. Sources reported that Azerbaijani authorities had reissued a map renaming a street in Stepanakert, the capital of Nagorno-Karabakh, after one of the main instigators of the Armenian genocide Enver Pasha. Azerbaijani official disputed this during a case at the International Court of Justice, saying that "No streets in Khankandi have been renamed".

A spokesperson for the US State Department declined to comment on qualifying the events as ethnic cleansing and said that the United States believes there should be an international monitoring mission there to observe and guarantee the rights and securities of ethnic Armenians. Samantha Power, the top U.S. humanitarian aid official and a former genocide scholar, declined to use the term "genocide", nevertheless, she went on to say that testimony was already being gathered "from people who have fled violence, deprivation, and with the fear of living under the government of Azerbaijan."

President of the European Council Charles Michel refrained from characterizing the forced exodus of the Nagorno-Karabakh population as an attempt at ethnic cleansing on 3 October 2023. However, on 5 October 2023, the European Parliament filed a joint motion for a resolution stating that the flight of Armenians from Karabakh "amounts to ethnic cleansing" and that Azerbaijan's military offensive "represents a gross violation of human rights and international law."

Leo Docherty, the UK Parliamentary Under-Secretary of State for Foreign, Commonwealth and Development Affairs, stated that he does not agree that Azerbaijan's military operation in Nagorno-Karabakh constituted ethnic cleansing, and that the UK urged both sides to resume dialogue. Conversely, UK Parliament members Carol Monaghan, John Whittingdale, Chris Law, Rupa Huq, Tim Loughton, Jessica Morden, and Stephen Doughty have explicitly recognized the expulsion as ethnic cleansing, and called for stronger assistance to the Armenian refugees.

Russian Foreign Ministry Spokeswoman Maria Zakharova stated that she would like "some facts to be provided regarding the alleged ethnic cleansing in Nagorno-Karabakh", and asked for references to "at least some document from any international organisation that is considered authoritative in Yerevan (for example, the UN or some other), or a statement indicating that such ethnic cleansing did take place". Deputy Foreign Minister of the Russian Federation Mikhail Galuzin stated that unfortunately most Karabakh Armenians left the region by their own difficult, but voluntary choice, and that Russia was ready to facilitate safe return of those Karabakh Armenians who wish to.

== International response ==
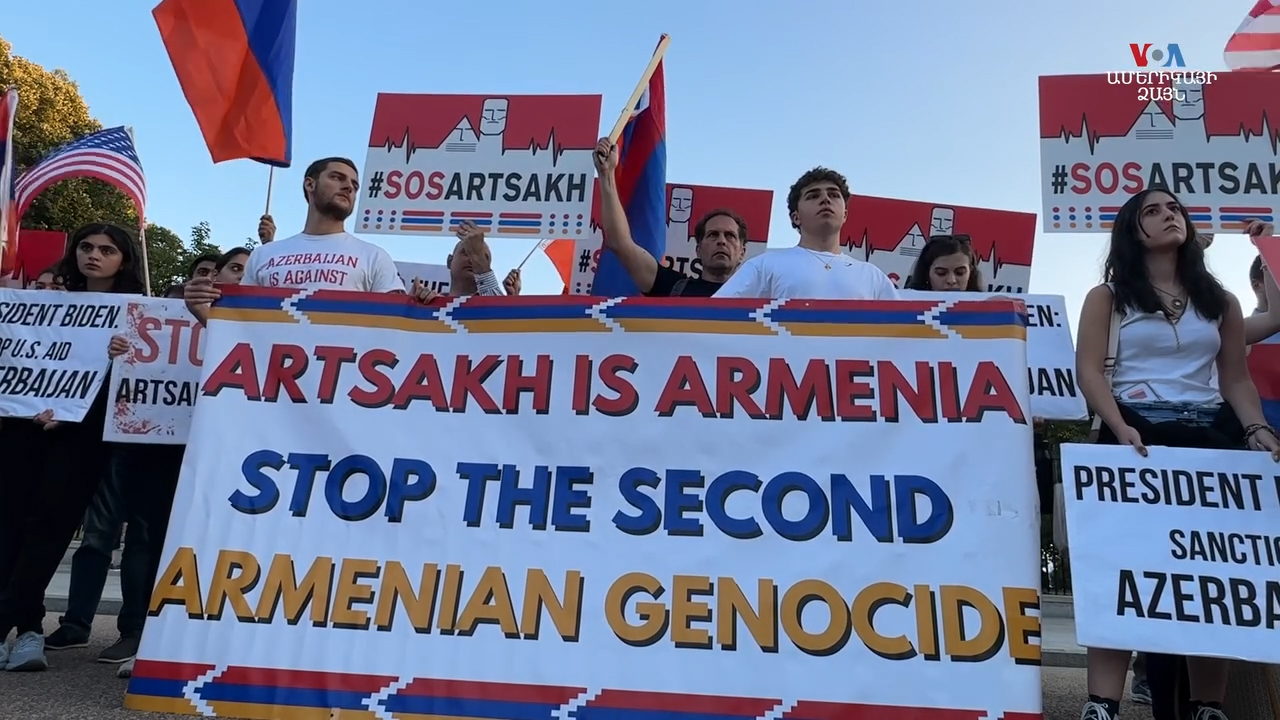
Armenians in Washington held a protest in front of the White House due to the Azerbaijani offensive in Nagorno-Karabakh, September 21, 2023.

In response to the humanitarian crisis a number of countries pledged aid to help Armenian refugees, including Iran which donated 50 tons of aid to forcibly displaced Artsakh residents, the UK with £1 million and the EU with a pledge of €5 million. The chief of USAID Samantha Power arrived in Armenia together with US State Department Acting Assistant Secretary for Europe and Eurasian Affairs Yuri Kim to visit the affected people and pledged $11.5 million in humanitarian assistance. Power said that "many of those who had arrived were suffering from 'severe malnutrition,' according to doctors at the scene". On 28 September, USAID sent a Disaster Assistance Response Team to the region to help coordinate the U.S. humanitarian response. Cyprus said it was ready to provide humanitarian assistance to displaced Armenians and that it was considering ways to host a number of Armenian refugees if necessary.

The United Nations in Azerbaijan sent on 1 October 2023 a mission to Nagorno-Karabakh, led by the UN Resident Coordinator in Azerbaijan Vladanka Andreeva, to address humanitarian needs. The team also included the Director of the Coordination Division of the UN Office for the Coordination of Humanitarian Affairs, as well as representatives from the FAO, the UNHCR, the UNICEF, the WHO, and other UN bodies. The UN mission reported that "they did not come across any reports — either from the local population or from others — of violence against civilians following the latest ceasefire." While visiting Stepanakert, the team reported to have found no evidence of damage to public infrastructure in the areas it visited. The mission saw that the Azerbaijani government was preparing for the resumption of health services and some utilities. The mission reportedly "was struck by the sudden manner in which the local population left their homes". It was reported to the team that between 50 and 1,000 ethnic Armenians remain in the region. It encountered no civilian vehicles on the Lachin road to the border crossing used by the refugees. The mission also had limited access to rural areas. The mission was criticized in Armenia for failing to mention the numerous casualties and injuries among Armenian civilians, the targeting of civilian infrastructure by Azerbaijan, and blockade of Nagorno-Karabakh by Azerbaijan over the previous nine months along with the humanitarian crisis it caused.

Armenia requested the International Court of Justice to reaffirm its February 2023 ruling ordering Azerbaijan to ensure free passage through the Lachin corridor, and to "refrain from all actions directly or indirectly aimed at displacing the remaining ethnic Armenians from the region".

In December 2023, EU foreign policy chief Josep Borrell stated: "Look for example at what has happened in Azerbaijan and Armenia. A long-frozen conflict that suddenly has been – I would not say solved – but decisively determined by a military intervention that, in one week, made 150,000 people move. In one week. Like this. 150,000 people had to abandon their houses and run. And the international community regretted [it], expressed concern, sent humanitarian support, but it happened [with] the use of force."

== Azerbaijan's denial of the right of return ==
The Azerbaijani government has denied the right of return to former ethnic Armenians who fled. Multiple human rights observers, and government officials, including from the United Nations, International Court of Justice, Switzerland, Canada, and the European Parliament, have called on Azerbaijan to ensure the rights of ethnic Armenian residents to return safely to their homeland. Amnesty International stated that "the right [of ethnic Armenians] to remain in their own homes and other rights should not be made conditional on accepting Azerbaijani citizenship."

The Armenian refugees from Nagorno-Karabakh have petitioned for the principle of return. The government of Artsakh remains a government-in-exile. Samvel Shahramanyan, former and final president of Nagorno-Karabakh stated "Our right to return to our birthplace, our homeland, is not up for denial." However, the state-sponsored anti-Armenian sentiment within Azerbaijan complicates the possible return of Azerbaijan's ethnic Armenian population. The few Armenians which remain in Azerbaijan live in virtual hiding. Talin and Devedjian state that such an atmosphere "makes the safe, dignified return of Nagorno-Karabakh Armenians virtually impossible." The scholars emphasize that Azeri President Ilham Aliyev has publicly fostered antagonism against Armenians through gestures, including stepping on the Nagorno-Karabakh flag and overseeing the demolition of the parliamentary building of Nagorno-Karabakh.

Gegham Stepanyan, former Human Rights Defender of Artsakh, states, "The right of return is not some fairy tale; it is a right that is enshrined and must be protected." Critics have characterized the destruction of Armenian heritage sites in Nagorno-Karabakh as cultural genocide, or cultural erasure. According to Lori Khatchadourian, a professor and co-founder of Caucasus Heritage Watch, the erasure of Armenian heritage in the Azerbaijani-controlled exclave of Nakhchivan is an example of what may occur in Nagorno-Karabakh. The Aram Manoukian Institute states "the return of ethnic Armenians back to their homeland without preserving their cultural and religious presence (monuments, buildings, churches, and monasteries) will question the very existence of Armenian history on these territories."
