= Hugo Etherianus =

Pisan-Byzantine courtier (1115–1182)

Hugh Etherianus, or Ugo Eteriano (1115–1182), was an adviser on western church affairs to Byzantine emperor Manuel I Komnenos. Nothing is known of his family apart from a letter sent after his death by the Pope to his brother Leo, nicknamed Tuscus, which mentions a "nephew", possibly Hugh's son. He studied under Alberic in Paris some time before 1146, then was in Constantinople from about 1165–82. He and his brother Leo Tuscus, were Tuscans by birth, employed at the court of Constantinople under the Emperor Manuel I. Hugh was a Catholic theologian and controversialist, who became a Cardinal at the end of his life. He was born in Pisa and died in Constantinople.

He is notable for his work Contra Patarenos ("Against the Patarenes") which is a treatise against Catharism surviving in two Latin manuscripts in Oxford and Seville. Latin Patareni was an alternative name for Cathars, and the text sheds light on the relationship between western European Catharism and older Byzantine dualist movements such as Bogumils.

Hugo says that he was "occupied in translating the imperial letters" (Adversus Graecos 1:20), evidently an interpreter for Latin correspondence. Hugh, who does not seem to have held any official post at court, but was a very learned theologian, had many opportunities of discussing the questions at issue between the Greek Orthodox Church and Catholics.

== Works ==
As a result of these disputes, he wrote a work in three books: De haeresibus quas Graeci in Latinos devolvunt, sive quod Spiritus Sanctus ex utroque Patre et Filio procedit. This work, the first exhaustive and scientific defence of the Filioque, was composed in both Latin and Greek. The author sent copies to the Latin Patriarch of Antioch, Aimerikos, and to Pope Alexander III, whose letter of acknowledgment is still extant. Hugh Etherianus by this treatise obtained an important place among Catholic controversialists against the Eastern Church.

It appears that the emperor, who was well disposed towards Latins, had suggested that he should write it, having asked him whether they have "any authorities of saints who say that the Holy Ghost proceeds from the Son". Hugh had used his knowledge of Greek and his opportunities of studying the Greek Fathers. He was able to produce texts from nearly all the recognized authorities on both sides. He quotes especially Sts. Athanasius, Cyril of Alexandria, Basil, Gregory Nazianzen, Chrysostom, John Damascene, etc. From the Latins he produced witnesses from Sts. Augustine, Jerome, Gregory I, Ambrose, and Hilary of Poitiers. He was also well acquainted with the writings of his adversaries and quotes Photius, Nicetas of Thessalonica, Theophylactus of Ochrida, etc.

The Latin version is very corrupt and untrustworthy. There are also some incorrect expressions noted by the later editors, such as that God the Father is the cause of the Son (this is a concession to the Greeks that was, however, tolerated by the Council of Florence). Nevertheless, since it was written, this work has been the foundation of nearly all Latin controversy with the Greeks. St. Thomas Aquinas used it for his "Opusc. I, contra errores Graecorum" and Cardinal Bessarion refers to it with great praise (Ep. ad Alex., P.L., CLXI, 328).

Hugh Etherianus also wrote a treatise De regressu animarum ab inferis, in answer to a petition of the clergy of Pisa, and (probably) a short work De Graecorum malis consuetudinibus. A Liber de immortali Deo, written by him, is lost.
