= Mass arrest =

Simultaneous arrest of a large number of people by law enforcement

A mass arrest occurs when police apprehend large numbers of suspects at once. This sometimes occurs at protests. Some mass arrests are also used in an effort to combat gang activity. This is sometimes controversial, and lawsuits sometimes result. In police science, it is deemed to be good practice to plan for the identification of those arrested during mass arrests, since it is unlikely that the officers will remember everyone they arrested.

== Historical examples ==
The Japan Farmers' Union and Japanese labor-farmer groups were hit by mass arrests in the 1920s. On 16 April 1929, several thousand members of the farmers' movement were arrested. Following World War II, mass arrests (over 120,000) of actual and suspected Quislings occurred in Norway. Totalitarian regimes have sometimes conducted mass arrests as a prelude to a purge of perceived political enemies, sometimes through executions.

On 10 March 2010 a mass crackdown was initiated to thwart a planned peaceful 'million march' to be conducted in a South Indian state capital of Hyderabad demanding formation of a new federal unit, more than 100,000 Telangana people were taken in to custody by a police force controlled by the coastal 'andhra' elites.

The 2010 G-20 Toronto summit was witness to the largest mass arrest in Canadian history of 900 people.

=== Mass arrests of protesters in the United States ===
In December 1964, the University of California, Berkeley was disrupted by a mass student sit-in in the administration building and by mass arrests of 700 students.

Beginning on 3 May 1971, three days into the 1971 May Day Protests – a series of large-scale civil disobedience actions in Washington, D.C. – massive arrest sweeps begin. In a few days over 12,000 are arrested – the largest mass arrest in U.S. history.

Former American President Jimmy Carter said in regards to the racial conflicts of the time, "I would be opposed to mass arrest, and I would be opposed to preventive detention. But I think that the abuses in the past have in many cases exacerbated the disharmonies that brought about demonstrations, and I think that arrest of large numbers of people without warrants ... is a contrary to our best systems of justice."

On 15 September 1996, 1,033 peaceful protesters were arrested in Carlotta, CA at a rally to end the clearcutting of ancient redwood forests.

A famous mass arrest occurred on 27 September 2002, in Washington, DC in which several hundred anti-World Bank/International Monetary Fund protestors, journalists and bystanders were systematically arrested by police and charged with failure to obey a police order. A class action lawsuit against the government ensued. Pre-emptive mass arrests have also sometimes been criticized.

Over 1,700 protesters were arrested during the 2004 Republican National Convention in New York City.

On 1 October 2011, more than 700 protesters with the Occupy Wall Street movement were arrested while attempting to march across the bridge on the roadway.

On 28 January 2012, also as part of the Occupy movement, more than 400 people were arrested in Oakland, CA.

During a seven-day span on Capitol Hill, from 11 April through 18 April 2016, police arrested approximately 1,240 people (300 arrests were made on 18 April alone) who were demonstrating for reforms to how Americans vote and campaign in elections.

On 6 January 2021, 53 activists, former legislators, social workers and academics were arrested by the National Security Department of the Hong Kong Police Force under the national security law over their organisation and participation in the primaries for the subsequently postponed Legislative Council election, including six organisers and 48 participants, of which two were arrested in jail, making it the largest crackdown under the national security law since its passage on 30 June 2020. Authorities also raided 72 sites including the home of jailed activist Joshua Wong, the offices of news outlets Apple Daily, Stand News and Hong Kong Inmedia; and polling institute Hong Kong Public Opinion Research Institute (PORI), and froze more than $200,000 in funds related to the primaries. The arrests reduced the pro-democracy camp, including its moderate wing, considerably, and targeted several prominent figures. These have been characterized as mass arrests.

== War crime ==
Indiscriminate mass arrests were designated a war crime in 1944 by a commission on war crimes created by the London International Assembly. That was one of two items added by that Commission to the list of war crimes that had been drawn up by the Commission on the Responsibility of the Authors of the War and on Enforcement of Penalties in 1919. Specifically, "indiscriminate mass arrests for the purpose of terrorizing the population" were designated as war crimes by the commission.

At the Netherlands temporary court martial in 1947, several members of the tokkeitai in the Netherlands East Indies were accused of the war crime of indiscriminate mass arrests. The applicable legislation, used by the court, was the NEI Statute Book Decree #44 of 1946, whose definition of war crimes paralleled the commission's list. Specifically, item #34 of the enumerated list of war crimes under the NEI legislation was "indiscriminate mass arrests for the purpose of terrorising the population, whether described as taking hostages or not". The court understood the definition of such unlawful mass arrests to be as "arrests of groups of persons firstly on the ground of wild rumours and suppositions, and secondly without definite facts and indications being present with regard to each person which would justify his arrest". It added commentary on indiscriminate mass arrests that are for the purpose of terrorizing the populace by stating that they "contained the elements of systematic terrorism for nobody, even the most innocent, was any longer certain of his liberty, and a person once arrested, even if absolutely innocent, could no longer be sure of health and life".

== See also ==
- Arbitrary arrest and detention
- January 2021 arrests of Hong Kong pro-democracy activists
