= Great Book of Interpretation of Dreams =

Book by Ibn Sirin

The Great Book of Interpretation of Dreams (Arabic: تفسير الأحلام الكبير, Tafsir al-Ahlam al-Kabir) attributed to the 7th century Muslim scholar Ibn Sirin which was originally compiled in the 15th century by al-Dārī under the title Selection of Statements on the Exegesis of Dreams.

The typology of categorization of dreams in Arabic literature of dream interpretation is noted for its close adherence to orthodox theological categories, and assumes an intimate relationship between dreaming and conventional expressions of devotional religious piety. Traditional Arabic books of dream-interpretation were composed by theologians.

== Contents ==
The Great Book of Interpretation of Dreams is in 59 chapters, thus:

1. Seeing God Almighty
2. Seeing the prophets
3. Seeing archangels and angels
4. Seeing the Prophet's companions
5. The various chapters of the Holy Quran
6. Islam
7. Saluting and shaking hands
8. Cleanliness
9. Call for prayers; praying
10. Rites
11. Seeing the mosque, the prayer niche, or the minaret
12. Seeing alms-giving and the feeding of the poor
13. Fasting and breaking the fast
14. Pilgrimage
15. Jihad
16. Death, the dead, tombs
17. Day of Resurrection; the Judgement; the Balance of the Last Day
18. Hell
19. Paradise
20. Jinn
21. People, old and young
22. Parts of the body
23. Bodily secretions and excrements
24. Sounds and languages of animals
25. Pains and diseases
26. Remedies, medicines, potions
27. Food, cooking utensils, dining tables
28. Harps, cups, games, perfumes
29. Clothes
30. Sultans, kings and their courts
31. Warfare and weapons
32. Craftsmen
33. Horses and livestock
34. Wild beasts
35. Birds
36. Traps, fishing hooks, snares
37. Pests, insects
38. Breeze, wind, rain, earthquakes, lightning, rainbow, etc.
39. -
40. Metals, minerals, petroleum
41. Sea, rivers, wells
42. Fire
43. Trees
44. Grain, legumes, melons, cucumber
45. Pens, ink, writing
46. Idols
47. Rugs, beds, canopies, curtains, tents
48. Riders, saddles, stirrups, reins, bridles
49. Spinning, weaving, ropes
50. Sleeping; servants and slaves
51. Drinking and eating
52. Calamities
53. Pairs of opposite qualities
54. Marriage and adultery
55. Traveling
56. Selling, lending, borrowing
57. Disputes
58. Scattered dreams
59. Stories by holy men
