= Oneirocritica =

Treatise on dream interpretation by Artemidorus in the 2nd century AD

Oneirocritica (Greek: Ονειροκριτικά) (The Interpretation of Dreams) is an ancient Greek treatise on dream interpretation written by Artemidorus Daldianus in the 2nd century AD. It is the earliest extant Greek work on the subject, in five books, though in it Artemidorus mentions numerous other – now lost – works from which his own is at least partially derived, including the 1st-century Oneirocritica by Artemon of Miletus.

The first three volumes were intended for the general public, providing an encyclopedic treatment of the subject matter of dreams, and the remaining two volumes were written for the private use of the author's son, a novice dream interpreter. Artemidorus inscribed the book "Artemidorus of Daldis", despite having been born in Ephesus, to commemorate the little-known birthplace of his mother in Lydia (3.66).

Artemidorus suggests that dreams are unique to the individual, and that a person's waking life will affect the symbols in his dreams. He shows awareness of the dreaming mind's capacity to use metaphors in its messages.

Michel Foucault, who discusses the Oneirocritica in The Care of the Self, the third volume of his The History of Sexuality (1976–1984), describes the text as a practical, experiential guide. According to Foucault, the work reveals culturally salient patterns relating to "the ethical experience of the aphrodisia".

== Books ==
The first three books divide dreams into major groups. Book one is dedicated to the anatomy and activity of the human body: 82 sections interpret the appearance in dreams of subjects like head size, eating, and sexual activity. For example, section 52 says, concerning one activity of the body, "All tools that cut and divide things in half signify disagreements, factions, and injuries ... Tools that smooth out surfaces predict an end to enmities."

The second book treats objects and events in the natural world, such as weather, animals, the gods and flying. The section on animals includes mammals (domestic and wild), sea creatures, reptiles, and those that fly. So in chapter 12 we find: "There is an affinity between all wild animals and our enemies. A wolf signifies a violent enemy ... A fox indicates that the enemy will not attack openly but will plot underhandedly."

The third book is miscellaneous. It provides further interpretations of dreams, focusing on various situations and objects that may appear. Artemidorus continues his methodical analysis, examining the significance of dreams related to different aspects of everyday life and the natural world.

Artemidorus moves from dream content to the technique of dream interpretation in book four, which is addressed to his son. He states that the interpreter needs to know the background of the dreamer, such as his occupation, health, status, habits, and age. The plausibility of dream content should be considered, which cannot be done without reference to the dreamer. The interpreter should find out how the subject feels about each component of the dream. In book five, Artemidorus presents a further 95 dreams he collected, for his son to use as practice material.

Artemidorus stresses the empirical nature of his research: "I did not rely upon any simple theory of probabilities but rather on experience and the testimony of actual dream-fulfillments." His research took him to cities in Greece, Italy and its larger islands, and Asia Minor. He indicates that he reviewed all available literature on dreams, and that he spent years consulting with oral interpreters.

== Editions and translations ==
- The definitive edition of the Greek text is by Roger Pack, Artemidori Daldiani Onirocriticon Libri V (Teubner 1963)
- A medieval Arabic version was made of the first three books (i.e., the "public" books) in 877 AD by Hunayn ibn Ishaq, and published by Toufic Fahd with a French translation in 1964 under the title Le livre des songes [par] Artémidore d'Éphèse
- The most recent English translation is by Martin Hammond (Oxford: Oxford University Press, 2020)
- The most recent Italian translation is by Dario Del Corno, Libro dei sogni (1974)
- The most recent French translation is by A.J. Festugière, Clef des Songes (1975)
- The "fragments" of other Greco-Roman oneirocritic authors were compiled by Dario Del Corno in his Graecorum de re Onirocritica Scriptorum Reliquiae (1969), with commentary in Italian. As many of the fragments are preserved by Artemidorus, Del Corno's work is also a partial commentary to the Oneirocritica.
- There is also a Dutch translation, by Simone Mooij-Valk, called Droomboek (2003)
- There is an English translation and commentary by Robert J. White, Oneirocritica (Noyes Classical Studies, 1975)

== References and sources ==
Sources

- van de Castle, Robert L. (1994). Our Dreaming Mind. New York: Ballantine Books. pp. 66–69. ISBN 0-345-39666-9.
