= List of pre-modern Arab scientists and scholars =

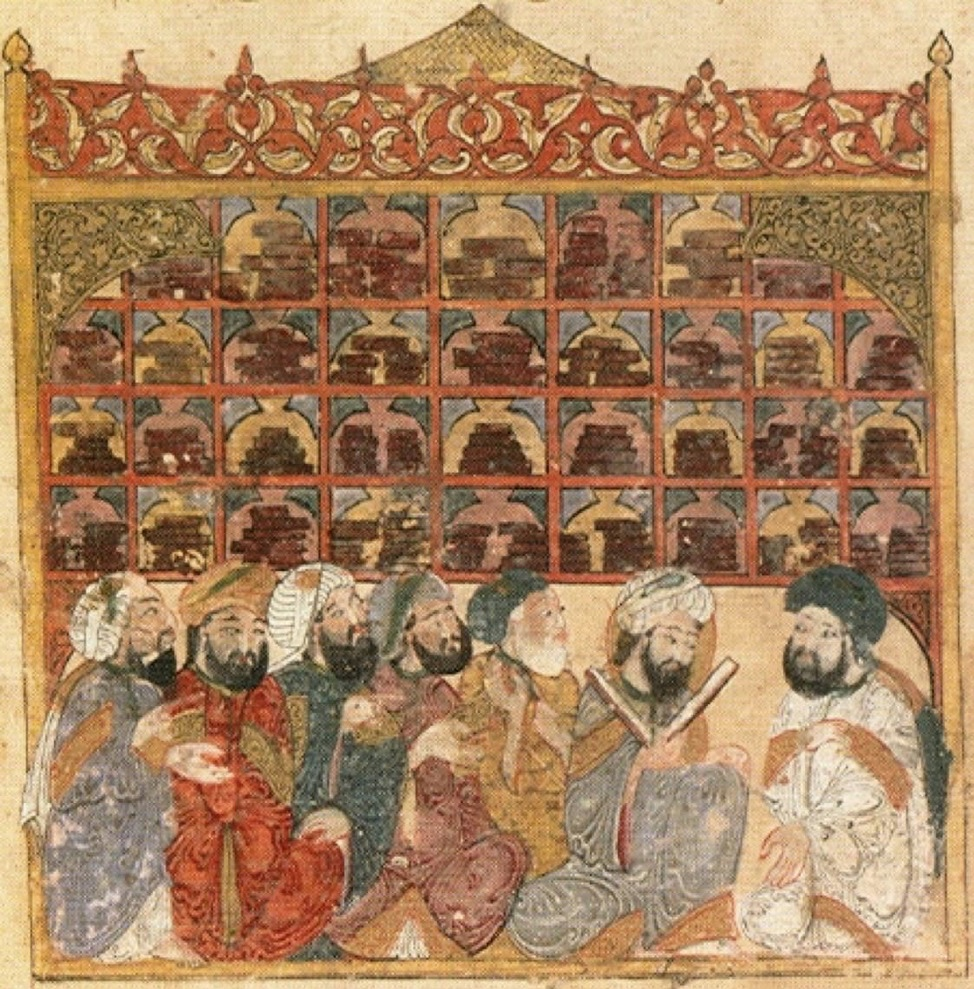
Arab scholars at an Abbasid library in Baghdad. Maqamat of al-Hariri Illustration, 1237.

Arab scientists and scholars from the Muslim World, including Al-Andalus (Spain), who lived from antiquity up until the beginning of the modern age, include the following. The list consists primarily of scholars during the Middle Ages.

Both the Arabic and Latin names are given. The following Arabic naming articles are not used for indexing:

- Al - the
- Ibn, bin, banu - son of
- abu, abi - father of, the one with

== A ==
- Ali (601, Mecca – 661, Kufa ), Arabic grammarian, rhetoric, theologian, exegesist.
- Abbas Ibn Firnas, astronomer, mathematician, physicist, inventor
- Aisha al-Bauniyya (1402–1475), an Arab woman Sufi master and poet
- Avempace (1085, Zaragoza – 1138, Fez), philosopher, astronomer, physician
- Ammar al-Mawsili (10th century, b. Mosul), ophthalmologist and physician
- Ali al-Uraidhi (7th century, b. Medina), Muslim scholar
- Ali ibn Isa al-Kahhal (fl. 1010), physician and ophthalmologist
- Ali al-Hadi (829, Medina – 868, Samarra), Islamic scholar
- Ali ibn al-Madini (778, Basra – 849, Samarra), Islamic scholar and traditionalist
- Ali ibn Ridwan (988, Giza – 1061, Baghdad), astronomer and geometer with Khalid Ben Abdulmelik
- Ali al-Ridha (765, Medina – 818, Tus), Islamic scholar and theologian
- Ahmad ibn Hanbal (780, Baghdad – 855, Baghdad), theologian, ascetic, and hadith traditionist
- Ahmad al-Muhajir (873, Basra – 956, Al-Husaisa), scholar and teacher
- Ahmad ibn Yusuf (835, Baghdad – 912, Cairo), mathematician
- Ahmad ibn Abi Bakr al-Zuhri (767, Medina – 856), Maliki jurist
- Apollodorus of Damascus (50, Damascus – 130), architect, engineer, and designer
- Abd al-Salam ibn Mashish al-Alami (1140, Jabal Alam – 1227, Jabal Alam), religious scholar of Sufism
- Abdullah ibn Umar (610, Mecca – 693, Mecca), Islamic scholar and hadith narrator
- Abd Allah al-Qaysi (d. 885, b. Spain), Muslim jurist and theologian
- Abd-Allah ibn Ibadh (d. 708, b. Basra), hadith narrator and theologian
- Abd al-Hamid al-Katib (d. 756), founder of Arabic prose
- Ibn Abbas (619, Mecca – 687, Ta'if), jurist and theologian
- Abdullah ibn Alawi al-Haddad (1634, Tarim – 1720, Tarim), Sufi saint and jurist
- Abd al-Ghani al-Maqdisi (1146, Jamma'in – 1203), Islamic scholar and a prominent hadith master
- Abd al-Aziz Yemeni Tamimi (816, Yemen – 944, Yemen), Sufi saint and scholar
- Abu al-Fazal Yemeni Tamimi (842, Hejaz – 1034, Baghdad), Sufi saint and mystic
- Abu al-Aswad al-Du'ali (603–689, Basra), grammarian
- Abu al-Hasan al-Ash'ari (874, Basra – 936, Baghdad), philosopher, Shafi'i scholar and theologian
- Abu Jafar al-Ghafiqi (d. 1165), an Arab botanist, pharmacologist, physician and scholar
- Abu Bakr ibn al-Arabi (1076, Seville – 1148), Islamic scholar and judge of Maliki law
- Abū Kāmil Shujāʿ ibn Aslam (850–930), mathematician
- Abu 'Amr ibn al-'Ala' (689, Mecca – 770, Kufa) linguists and grammarian
- Abu Bakr al-Aydarus (1447, Tarim – 1508, Aden), religious scholar of Sufism
- Abu Ishaq Ibrahim al-Zarqali (1029–1100), was an Arab maker of astronomical instruments and an astrologer
- Al-Ashraf Umar II (1242, Yemen – 1296, Yemen), astronomer and ruler of Yemen
- Al-Akhfash al-Akbar (d. 793, b. Basra), Arab grammarian
- Al-Awza'i (707, Baalbek – 774, Beirut), jurist and theologian
- Al-Asma'i (739, Basra – 831, Basra), pioneer of zoology, botany and animal husbandry
- Ibn Abi Asim (821, Basra – 900, Isfahan), scholar, famous or his work in the hadith science
- Ibn al-'Awwam (12th century, b. Seville), agriculturist and botanist
- Ibn al-Adim (1192, Aleppo – 1262, Egypt), biographer and historian
- Ibn al-A'lam (d. 985, Baghdad), astronomer and astrologer
- Ibn al-Athir (1160, Cizre – 1233, Mosul), historian and biographer
- Ibn al-Abbar (1199, Valencia – 1260, Tunis), historian, poet, diplomat, theologian and scholar
- Ibn al-Akfani (1286, Sinjar – 1348, Cairo), Arab encyclopedist and physician
- Ibn 'Adlan (1187, Mosul – 1268, Cairo), cryptographer and poet
- Ibn Arabi (1165, Murcia – 1240, Damascus), Islamic scholar and philosopher
- Ibn Arabshah (1389, Damascus – 1450, Egypt), writer and traveller

== B ==
- Bahāʾ al-dīn al-ʿĀmilī (1547, Baalbek – 1621, Isfahan), philosopher, architect, mathematician, astronomer
- Bahlool (d. 807, b. Baghdad), judge and scholar
- Abu Mansur al-Baghdadi (980, Baghdad – 1037, Esfarayen), mathematician
- Abd al-Latif al-Baghdadi (1162, Baghdad – 1231, Baghdad), physician, historian, Egyptologist and traveler
- Al-Baqillani (d. 1013, b. Basra), theologian, scholar, and Maliki lawyer
- Al-Battani (850, Harran – 929, Samarra), astronomer and mathematician
- Al-Baladhuri (820, Baghdad – 892, Baghdad), historian
- Al-Buni (d. 1225), writer and mathematician
- Al-Bakri (1014, Huelva – 1094, Cordoba), geographer and historian
- Al-Baji (1156, Beja – 1231, Sidi Bou Said), Sufi mystic and scholar
- Ibn al-Banna' al-Marrakushi (1256, Marrakesh – 1321), mathematician, astronomer, Islamic scholar, Sufi, and astrologer
- Ibn al-Baitar (1197, Malaga – 1248, Damascus), pharmacist, botanist, physician
- Ibn Bassal (b. 1085, Toledo), botanist and agronomist
- Ibn Bassam (1058, Santarem – 1147), poet and historian
- Ibn Butlan (1038, Baghdad – 1075), Arab Christian physician

== C ==
- Cosmas (d. 287, Yumurtalik), Arab physician and saint
- Calid (d. 704, Homs), Umayyad prince and alchemist
- Callinicus (3rd century), historian, orator, rhetorician and sophist

== D ==
- Damian (d. 287, Yumurtalik), Arab physician and saint
- Dawud al-Antaki (b. Idlib – d. 1599, Mecca), physician and pharmacist
- Dawud Tai (1344–1405), Islamic scholar and Sufi mystic
- Diya al-Din al-Maqdisi (918, Damascus – 995), Hanbali Islamic scholar
- Abu Dawood (817, Sistan – 889, Basra), Islamic scholar
- Al-Damiri (1344, Cairo – 1405, Cairo), zoologist
- Al-Dakhwar (1170, Damascus – 1230), physician
- Al-Darimi (797, Samarkand – 869, Muscat), Islamic scholar and muhaddith
- Al-Dimashqi (1256, Damascus – 1327, Safed), geographer
- Al-Dimashqi, Abu al-Fadl (12th-century), writer and economist
- Ibn al-Durayhim (1312–1359/62), cryptologist
- Ibn Dihya (1150, Valencia – 1235, Cairo), scholar of Arabic language and Islamic studies
- Ibn Duraid (837, Basra – 934, Baghdad), geographer, genealogist, poet, and philologist
- Ibn Daqiq al-'Id (1228, Yanbu – 1302), one of Islam's great scholars in the fundamentals of Islamic law and belief, and was an authority in the Shafi'i legal school

== F ==
- Fatima al-Fihri (800, Kairouan – 880), science patron and founder of the Al Quaraouiyine mosque
- Fatima bint Musa (790–816), theologian and saint
- Ibn Fallus (13th century), mathematician
- Al-Farahidi (c. 718 – 791), writer and philologist, compiled the first dictionary of the Arabic language, the Kitab al-Ayn
- Al-Fasi, Abu al-Mahasin (1530–1604), Sufi saint
- Al-Farghani (d. 880), astronomer, known in Latin as Alfraganus
- Ibn al-Furat (1334–1405), historian
- Ibn al-Farid (c. 1181 – 1234), Arabic poet, writer, and philosopher
- Ibn Fadlan (10th century), writer, traveler, member of an embassy of the Caliph of Baghdad to the Volga Bulgars

== G ==
- Genethlius (3rd century), sophist and rhetorician from Petra
- Al-Ghafiqi (d. 1165), 12th-century oculist
- Al-Ghassani (1548–1610), physician

== H ==
- Haly Abenragel (d. 1037), astrologer, best known for his Kitāb al-bāri' fi ahkām an-nujūm
- Harbi al-Himyari (8th century), alchemist
- Hasan al-Rammah (d. 1295), chemist and engineer
- Hamdallah Mustawfi (1281–1349), geographer
- Hunayn ibn Ishaq (809–873), Arab Christian scholar, physician, and scientist
- Heliodorus (3rd century), sophist of Arab origin
- Hisham ibn al-Kalbi (d. 819), historian
- Hafsa bint Sirin (651–719), scholar of Islam
- Harun ibn Musa (d. 786), scholar of the Arabic language and Islamic studies.
- Harith al-Muhasibi (781–857), philosopher, theologian and Sufi scholar
- Abu'l-Hasan al-Bayhaqi (1097–1169), astronomer and historian
- Abu'l Abbas al-Hijazi (12th century), traveler, merchant and sailor
- Abul Hasan Hankari (1018–1093), philosopher, theologian and jurist
- Al-Hamdani (893–945), geographer, historian and astronomer
- Al-Humaydī al-Azdi (1029–1095), historian
- Al-Harith ibn Kalada (d. 634–35), physician
- Al-Hilli (1250–1325), Twelver Shia theologian
- Ibn 'Abd al-Hakam (803–871), Egyptian historian
- Ibn al-Haj (1250–1336), scholar and theologian writer
- Ibn al-Haytham (965–1040), physicist and mathematician
- Ibn Hawqal (943–969), writer, geographer, and chronicler
- Ibn Hubal (1122–1213), physician, scientist and author of a medical compendium
- Ibn Hisham (d. 835), historian and biographer
- Ibn Hajar al-Haytami (1503–1566), jurist and theologian

== I ==
- Ibrāhīm al-Fazārī (d. 777), mathematician and astronomer
- Ibrahim al-Nakha'i (670–717), theologian, Islamic scholar
- Ibrahim al-Nazzam (c. 775 – c. 845), Mu'tazilite theologian and poet
- Iamblichus (c. 245 – c. 325), Neoplatonist philosopher, mystic and philosopher
- Iamblichus (c. 165 – 180), novelist and rhetorician
- Ismail Qureshi al Hashmi (1260–1349), Sufi scholar
- Ismail al-Jazari (1136–1206), scholar, inventor, mechanical engineer, artisan, artist
- Ismail ibn al-Ahmar (1324–1407), historian
- Ishaq ibn Hunayn (c. 830 – c. 910/1), physician and translator
- Izz al-Din ibn 'Abd al-Salam (1181–1262), theologian and jurist
- Al-Idrisi (1099–1166), geographer and cartographer
- Al-ʻIjliyyah, (10th-century), female maker of astrolabes
- Ibn Abi Ishaq (d. 735), earliest known grammarian of the Arabic language
- Ibn Ishaq (704–761), historian and hagiographer
- Ibn al-Haam al-Misri Al-Miqdisi (1352–1412), Mathematician
- Ibn Sa'id al-Maghribi, geographer, historian, poet, and collector of poetry from al-Andalus (1213–1286).

== J ==
- Ja'far al-Sadiq (702–765), theologian and alchemist
- Jabir ibn Aflah (1100–1150), astronomer and mathematician who invented torquetum
- Jabir ibn Hayyan (died c. 806–816), alchemist and polymath, pioneer of organic chemistry; may also have been Persian
- Jābir ibn Zayd (8th century), theologian and jurist
- Al-Jawaliqi (1074–1144), grammarian and philologist
- Al-Jahiz (776–869), historian, biologist and author
- Al-Jayyānī (989–1079), mathematician and author
- Al-Jawbari (fl. 1222), alchemist and writer
- Al-Jabali (d. 976), physician and mathematician from Al-Andalus
- Al-Jubba'i (d. 915), Mu'tazili theologian and philosopher
- Al-Jazari (1136–1206), inventor, engineer, artisan
- Al-Jarmi (d. 840), grammarian of Arabic Language
- Ibn al-Jazzar (10th century), influential 10th-century physician and author
- Ibn al-Jawzi (1116–1201), heresiographer, historian, hagiographer and philologist
- Ibn Juzayy (d. 1357), historian, scholar and writer of poetry
- Ibn Juljul (c. 944–c. 994), physician and pharmacologist
- Ibn Jazla (11th century), physician and author of influential treatise on regimen
- Ibn Jubayr (1145–1217), geographer, traveller and poet, known for his detailed travel journals

== K ==
- Khalifah ibn Khayyat (777–854), Arab historian
- Khwaja al-Ansari (1006–1088), Islamic scholar
- Al-Khalili (1320–1380), astronomer who compiled extensive tables for astronomical use
- Al-Khatib al-Baghdadi (1002–1071), Islamic scholar and historian
- Al-Khayyat (c. 770–c. 835), astrologer and a student of Mashallah
- Al-Kindi (c. 801–873), Arab philosopher, mathematician, astronomer, physician and geographer
- Ibn al-Khabbaza (d. 1239), historian and poet
- Ibn al-Kammad (d. 1195), astronomer
- Ibn al-Kattani (951–1029), scholar, philosopher, physician, astrologer, man of letters, and poet
- Ali ibn Khalaf (11th century), astronomer
- Ibn al-Khatib (1313–1374), polymath, poet, writer, historian, philosopher, physician
- Ibn Kathir (c. 1300–1373), influential Sunni scholar and historian
- Ibn Khaldun (1332–1406), historian, sociologist, and philosopher

== L ==
- Al-Laqani (d. 1631), mufti of Maliki law, a scholar of Hadith, a scholar of theology and author of one of the didactic poems on Ash'ari theology
- Al-Lakhmi (1006–1085), jurist in the Maliki school

== M ==
- Malik ibn Anas (711–795), theologian, and hadith traditionist
- Maslama al-Majriti (950–1007), astronomer, chemist, mathematician, economist
- Moulay Brahim (d. 1661 CE), Sufi saint
- Mujir al-Din (1456–1522), qadi and historian
- Mohammed al-Mahdi al-Fasi (1624–1698), mystic, biographer and historian
- Mohammed al-Arbi al-Fasi (1580–1642), author
- Mohammed ibn Qasim al-Tamimi (1140–1207), hadith scholar and biographer
- Mohammed ibn Nasir (1603–1674), theologian, scholar and physician
- Makhdoom Ali Mahimi (1372–1431), Muslim scholar and saint
- Muslim ibn al-Hajjaj (815–875), Islamic scholar, theologian and famous hadith compiler
- Mujahid ibn Jabr (645–722), Islamic scholar and jurist
- Mohammed ibn al-Tayyib (1698–1756), linguist, historian and scholar of fikh and hadith
- Muḥammad ibn Ibrāhīm al-Fazārī (d. 796 or 806), Muslim philosopher, mathematician and astronomer
- Muhammad al-Baghdadi (d. 1037), mathematician
- Muhammad ibn Aslam Al-Ghafiqi (d.1165), an Arab doctor, ophthalmologist and pharmacist
- Muhammad Ibn Wasi' Al-Azdi (d. 751), Islamic scholar of hadith, judge and soldier
- Muhammad al-Shaybani (749/50 – 805), father of Muslim international law
- Muhammed ibn Umail al-Tamimi (900–960), Arab alchemist
- Muwaffaq al-Din Yaqub ibn Siqlab (1155/6-1228), Arab Christian physician
- Abu al-Majd ibn Abi al-Hakam (d. 1174), physician, musician and astrologer
- Abu Mikhnaf (d. 774), historian
- Abu Madyan (1126–1198), influential Andalusian mystic and a Sufi master
- Al-Masudi (896–956), historian, geographer and philosopher, traveled to Spain, Russia, India, Sri Lanka and China, spent his last years in Syria and Egypt
- Al-Maʿarri (973–1057), blind Arab philosopher, poet and writer
- Al-Maqrizi (1364–1442), historian
- Al-Maqdisi (946–991), medieval Arab geographer, author of Ahsan at-Taqasim fi Ma`rifat il-Aqalim (The Best Divisions for Knowledge of the Regions)
- Al-Maziri (1061–1141 CE), jurist in the Maliki school
- Al-Mubarrad (826–898), grammarian and linguist
- Al-Mubashshir ibn Fatik (11th century), mathematician
- Al-Musabbihi (977–1030), Fatimid historian
- Ibn Khalaf al-Muradi (11th century) mechanical engineer and inventor
- Ibn al-Majdi (1359–1447), mathematician and astronomer
- Ibn Manzur (1233–1312), lexicographer and linguist
- Ibn Malik (1203/1204 or 1204/1025 – 21 February 1274) grammarian
- Ibn Mājid (1432–1500), navigator and poet
- Ibn Maḍāʾ (1116–1196), mathematician and grammarian

== N ==
- Niftawayh (858–935), grammarian
- Nur ad-Din al-Bitruji (d. 1204), astronomer and philosopher; the Alpetragius crater on the Moon is named after him
- Nadr ibn al-Harith (d. 624 CE), physician and practitioner
- Nafi ibn al-Harith (d. 13 AH/634–35), physician
- Abu Jaʿfar an-Nahhas (d. 338), grammarian
- Al-Nawawi (1234–1277), hadith scholar
- Al-Nuwayri (1279–1333), historian and encyclopedist
- Ibn al-Nafis (1213–1288), physician and author, the first to describe pulmonary circulation, compiled a medical encyclopedia and wrote numerous works on other subjects
- Ibn al-Nadim (d. 995), bibliophile of Baghdad and compiler of the Arabic encyclopedic catalogue known as 'Kitāb al-Fihrist'

== Q ==
- Qadi Ayyad (1083–1149), biographer and historian
- Qatāda ibn Di'āma (d. 735/736), traditionalist, hadith, tafsir, Arabic poetry and genealogy
- Qasim ibn Muhammad ibn Abi Bakr (660/62–728/30), Islamic scholar
- Abū al-Ḥasan al-Qalaṣādī (1412–1486), mathematician from Al-Andalus specializing in Islamic inheritance jurisprudence
- Al-Qabisi (d. 967), astrologer and mathematician
- Al-Qadi al-Nu'man (d. 974), official historian of the Fatimid caliphs
- Al-Qalqashandi (1355/56–1418), writer and mathematician
- Al-Qasabani (d. 1052), Arab philologist and grammarian
- Al-Qushayri (986–1074), theologian and philosopher
- Al-Qastallani (1448–1517), jurist and theologian
- Al-Qifti (1172–1248), historian
- Al-Qurtubi (1233–1286), muhaddith and faqih
- Ibn al-Qūṭiyya (d. 977), Andalusian historian
- Ibn al-Quff (1233–1286), physician
- Ibn al-Qasim (750–806), jurist in the Maliki school
- Ibn al-Qalanisi (c. 1071–1160), chronicler and historian
- Ibn Qayyim al-Jawziyya (1292–1350), theologian, and spiritual writer
- Ibn Qudamah (1147–1223), theologian

== R ==
- Rabia of Basra (714–801), philosopher and Sufi mystic
- Rashidun al-Suri (1177–1241), physician and botanist
- Raja ibn Haywah (7th century), architect, jurist and Arabic calligraphist
- Rufaida Al-Aslamia (b. 620), physician
- Al-Ruhawi (9th century), physician
- Ibn Abi Ramtha (7th century), physician
- Ibn al‐Raqqam (1250–1315), astronomer, mathematician and physician
- Ibn Rajab (1335–1392/93), Islamic scholar

== S ==
- Sahnun (776–854), Islamic scholar and Maliki jurist
- Said al-Andalusi (1029–1070), astronomer, historian and philosopher
- Said ibn al-Musayyib (642–715 CE), jurist and theologian
- Sa'id ibn Aws al-Ansari (d. 830), linguist
- Shihab al-Umari (1300–1349), historian
- Sayf ibn Umar (1428–1497), historian
- Sufyan al-Thawri (716–778), Islamic scholar and jurist
- Sa'id ibn Jubayr (665–714), theologian and jurist
- Sufyan ibn `Uyaynah (725–814), religious scholar and theologian
- Sidi Mahrez (951–1022), scholar, jurist and Qadi
- Sibt al-Maridini (1423–1506), astronomer and mathematician
- Sitt al-Wuzara al-Tanukhiyyah (1226/1226-1338), an Arab woman scholar
- Sulaiman al-Mahri (1480–1550), geographer
- Abu al-Salt (c. 1068–1134), astronomer, physician and alchemist
- Abu Amr al-Shaybani ((d. 821/28), lexicographer and collector of Arabic poetry
- Abu Saeed Mubarak Makhzoomi (1013–1119), theologian
- Al-Shafi‘i (767–820 CE), Islamic scholar
- Al-Sakhawi (1428–1497), hadith scholar and historian
- Al-Shaykh Al-Mufid (c. 948–1022 CE), Twelver Shia theologian
- Abu Ishaq al-Shatibi (1320–1388), Islamic legal scholar
- Al-Suwaydi (1204–1292), physician
- Al-Shifa' bint Abdullah (7th century), healer, wise woman and practiced folk-medicine
- Al-Sayyid al-Tanukhi (951–1022), Druze theologian and commentator
- Al-Suhayli (1114–1185), grammarian and scholar of law.
- Al-Ṣaidanānī (10th century), astronomer
- Ibn al-Shatir (1304–1375), astronomer, mathematician, engineer and inventor, worked at the Umayyad Mosque in Damascus, Syria, developed an original astronomical model
- Ibn al-Saffar (d. 1035), astronomer
- Ibn al-Samh (979–1035), mathematician and astronomer
- Ibn Sa'id al-Maghribi (1213–1286), geographer
- Ibn Sab'in (d. 1271), last philosopher of the Andalus
- Ibn Sidah (c.1007–1066), grammarian and lexicographer
- Ibn Sirin (d. 729), mystic, psychologist and interpreter of dreams
- Ibn Sa'd (784–845), scholar and Arabian biographer
- Ibn Shihab al-Zuhri (670–741), historian
- Ibn Sayyid al-Nās, Abu Bakr (1200–1261), Medieval theologian
- Ibn Sayyid al-Nās, Fath al-Din (1272–1334), Medieval theologian

== T ==
- Taqi al-Din Muhammad ibn Ma'ruf (1526–1585), physician, mathematician, clockmaker and astronomer
- Taqi al-Din al-Subki (1284 CE–1355 CE), scholar, jurist and judge
- Taj al-Din al-Subki (1327/28–1370), historian and jurist
- Taqi al-Din Muhammad al-Fasi (1373–1429), historian, scholar, hafith, faqih and Maliki qadi
- Taqiyya Umm Ali bint Ghaith ibn Ali al-Armanazi (1111-1183), an Arab woman poet and scholar
- Theodore Abu Qurrah (750–825), theologian and bishop
- Thābit ibn Qurra (826–902), mathematician, physician, astronomer, and translator
- Al-Tabarani (873–970), Islamic scholar
- Al-Tughrai (c. 1061–1122), physician and alchemist
- Al-Tahawi (843–933), jurist and a hadith scholar
- Al-Tighnari (1073–1118), agronomist, botanist, biologist
- Al-Tamimi (10th-century), physician from Palestine
- Al-Tawhīdī (923–1023), philosopher and thinker
- Ibn Taymiyyah (d. 1328), theologian and logician
- Ibn al-Tiqtaqa (d. 1310), historian
- Ibn Tawus (1193–1266), astrologer
- Ibn Tufail (1105–1185), Andalusian writer, novelist, Islamic philosopher, Islamic theologian, physician, astronomer, vizier, and court official
- Ibn al-Thahabi (d. 1033), physician and author of the first known alphabetical encyclopedia of medicine

== U ==
- Usama ibn Munqidh (1095–1188), Arab historian, politician, and diplomat
- Urwah ibn Zubayr (7th century), historian and jurist
- Umm al-Darda (7th century), jurist and theologian
- Umm Darda al-Sughra (7th century), jurist and scholar of Islam
- Umm Farwah (8th century), hadith narrator and saint
- Al-Uqlidisi (920–980), wrote two works on arithmetic, may have anticipated the invention of decimals
- Al-Urḍī (d. 1266), astronomer
- Ibn Abi Usaibia (1203–1270), physician and historian, wrote Uyun al-Anba fi Tabaqat al-Atibba (Lives of the Physicians)
- Ibn Uthal (7th century), physician
- Ibn Umail, (10th century), alchemist and mystic

== W ==
- Waddah al-Yaman (d. 709), poet, famous for his erotic and romantic poems
- Wasil ibn Ata (700–748), theologian and founder of the Mutazilite school of Islamic thought
- Al-Warraq (889–994), scholar and critic of religions
- Al-Wafa'i (1408–1471), astronomer
- Ibn al-Wafid (997–1074), pharmacologist and physician
- Ibn al-Wardi (1292–1342), historian
- Ibn Wahb (743–813 CE), jurist of Maliki school
- Ibn Wahshiyya (10th century), Arab alchemist and agriculturalist

== Y ==
- Yahya ibn Aktham (d. 857), jurist
- Yaʿīsh al-Umawī (1400–1489), mathematician, wrote works on mensuration and arithmetic
- Yusuf al-Mu'taman ibn Hud (11th century), mathematician
- Abu Yusuf (735–798), Islamic scholar
- Ibn Yunus (c. 950–1009), mathematician and astronomer

== Z ==
- Zayn al-Din al-Amidi (d. 1312 AD), Islamic scholar and inventor
- Zaynab bint al-Kamal (1248–1339), Arab woman scholar
- Zethos (3rd-century), neoplatonist and disciple of Plotinus
- Zakariya al-Qazwini (d. 1283), physician, astronomer, geographer, and proto-science fiction writer
- Zakariyya al-Ansari (c. 1420–1520), Islamic scholar and mystic
- Zayn al-Abidin (659–713), Muslim scholar and Twelver Imam
- Al-Zahrawi (936–1013), Islam's greatest medieval surgeon, wrote comprehensive medical texts combining Middle-Eastern, Indian and Greco-Roman classical teachings, shaped European surgical procedures until the Renaissance, considered the "father of surgery", wrote Al-Tasrif, a thirty-volume collection of medical practice
- Al-Zubayr ibn Bakkar (788–870), historian and genealogist
- Al-Zarqali (1028–1087), mathematician, influential astronomer, and instrument maker, contributed to the famous Tables of Toledo
- Ibn Zuhr (1091–1161), prominent physician of the Medieval Islamic period
- Ibn Zafar al Siqilli (1104–1172), Arab-Sicilian philosopher and polymath

== See also ==
- Science in the medieval Islamic world
- List of Christian scientists and scholars of the medieval Islamic world
- List of scientists in medieval Islamic world
- List of modern Arab scientists and engineers
- List of pre-modern Iranian scientists and scholars
