= Banu 'Akk =

Pre-islamic Arab tribe

Banu 'Akk بنو عك
- Adnanite/Qahtanite
- Banner of Banu 'Akk
- Ethnicity: Arab
- Nisba: Al-'Akki العكي
- Location: Yemen
- Descended from: Al-Dith ibn Adnan
- Branches: Banu Ghafiq
- Religion: Arabian Paganism, later Islam

Banu 'Akk (Arabic: بنو عك pronounced [ˈbanuː ʕak], Ancient South Arabian:𐩲𐩫𐩣 lit. ʿkm, ʿAkkum; Greek:’Αχχιται) or simply 'Akk, was one of the main pre-Islamic Arab tribes. The tribe inhabited Yemen in the Jahiliyyah.

== Traditional Arab genealogy ==
According to Ibn Hisham the members of the Banu 'Akk tribe are descendants of a man called Al-Dith ibn Adnan (Arabic: الديث بن عدنان) or also known as 'Akk. Akk dwelt in Yemen because he took a wife amongst the Banu Ash'ar and lived with them. The Banu Ash'ar were descended from Nabat ibn Udad ibn Zayd ibn Yashjub ibn Arib ibn Zayd ibn Kahlan ibn Saba'. While regarding the Banu 'Akk lineage, there seems to be a dispute between scholars in determining their origins. For example, According to al-Sam'ani they are of Adnanite origin. On the other hand, Ibn Hazm writes that they were descendant from Qahtan, hence, Qahtanite Arabs.

The mother of Madh'hij, who is the founder of the Madh'hij tribe, is said to be from 'Akk.

The tribe of Banu Ghafiq from which the general Abd al-Rahman al-Ghafiqi descended, is a branch of Banu 'Akk.

== History ==
=== Pre-Islamic period ===
The Arab tribes were known to go on a pilgrimage to the temples of the pagan deities of Arabia. Banu 'Akk tribesmen would travel from Yemen to Mecca to perform the pilgrimage to the deity Wadd. According to Kitab al-Asnam (The Book of Idols) of Ibn al-Kalbi, The Banu 'Akk had a unique chant and rituals to Wadd. The tribe would bring two young Kids from the tribe, of theirs in front of the tribesmen, and the young men proceed to shout: "We are the ghuraba 'Akk!" Guraba means we the roans of 'Akk because they live in the costal city of Hudaidah in yemen, then The tribesmen reply and shout: "'Akk to you submits, Your worshippers from Yemen. May we once more make this pilgrimage!"

=== Islamic period ===
The Banu 'Akk participated in many battles and conflicts. Under the Rashidun Caliphate, Amr ibn al-'As entered Egypt with an army that included approximately 3,000 to 4,000 men from the tribe of Banu 'Akk.

In 817 AD, the Banu 'Akk participated in a revolt alongside Banu Ash'ar against Abbasid Caliph al-Ma'mun's governor of Yemen

== Notable people ==
Among the tribe's members are:

- Abd al-Rahman ibn Abd Allah al-Ghafiqi Umayyad commander and governor of Al-Andalus
- Muhammad ibn Aslam Al-Ghafiqi An ophthalmologist who lived in the 12th century
- Mehjaa ibn Saleh The first Muslim killed in the Battle of Badr
- Abū Jaʿfar al-Ghāfiqī 12th century botanist
- Muhammad ibn Muqatil al-Akki Abbasid governor of Ifriqiya

== See also ==
- Wadd
- Tribes of Arabia
- Religion in pre-Islamic Arabia
