= Ibn Juljul =

10th century Andalusian Arab physician and pharmacologist

- Born: Sulaymān ibn Ḥassān; 944; Cordoba, Andalusia, now Spain
- Died: 994 (aged 50)
- Occupations: Muslim Physician, Pharmacologist
- Writing career
- Years active: circa 960– 994
- Notable works: Tabqat-ul-Atiba wal-Hukama' طبقات الأطباء والحكماء

Abu Dawud Sulayman ibn Hassan Ibn Juljul (Arabic: سليمان بن حسان ابن جلجل) (c. 944 Córdoba – c. 994) was an Andalusian Arab physician and pharmacologist of perhaps Spanish extraction. He wrote an important book on the history of medicine. His works on pharmacology were frequently quoted by physicians in Al-Andalus during the 10th and 11th centuries. Some of his works were later studied by Albertus Magnus, like De secretis, under Latinized version of his name, Gilgil.

== Life ==
Starting from the age of fourteen, Ibn Juljul studied medicine for ten years working under the physician Hasdai ibn Shaprut. He later became the personal physician of Caliph Hisham II, and continued working as a teacher of medicine. Ibn al-Baghunish of Toledo was one of his disciples.

== Works ==
Ibn Juljul's major book is Ṭabaqāt al-aṭibbā’ w’al-hukamā’ (Generations of physicians and Wise Men, Arabic: طبقات الأطباء والحكماء) which is an important work on the history of medicine using both Eastern and Western sources. The book includes 57 biographies of famous Greek, Islamic, African, and Spanish physicians and philosophers, and contains interesting information on the earliest accounts of Syriac translations into Arabic. The included biographies of contemporary Spanish physicians are notable because they give a clear insight about life in Cordoba during the 10th century. One of the biographies is that of Mohammed ibn Abdun al-Jabali, Ibn Juljul's contemporary and colleague physician at the court of Cordoba. Composed in 377/987, the Ṭabaqāt is considered to be the second oldest collection of biographies of physicians written in Arabic; the earliest being Taʾrīkh al-aṭibbāʾ by Ishaq ibn Hunayn. The Ṭabaqāt also records some of Ibn Juljul's thoughts on the decline of science in the Eastern Islamic provinces. Ibn Juljul states that:

The Abbasid empire was weakened by the power of the Daylamites and Turks, who were not concerned with science: scholars appear only in states whose kings seek knowledge.

Ibn Juljul also wrote a number of different treatises and letters concerning pharmacology, and wrote multiple translations and commentaries on the works of Dioscorides.

== See also ==
- List of Muslim scientists and scholars
