= Al-Zuhri =

al-Zuhri is an Arabic name which may refer to:

- Ibn Shihab al-Zuhri, 8th-century hadith scholar and jurist
- Ahmad ibn Abi Bakr al-Zuhri (767–856), 9th-century Maliki jurist
- Muhammad ibn Abi Bakr al-Zuhri, 12th-century Andalusian geographer

== See also ==
- Zuhri, a term in Maghrebi folklore referring to a child with supernatural abilities
- Banu Zuhrah, Arab tribe whose members carry the name al-Zuhri
