= Heliodorus =

Heliodorus /ˌhiːliəˈdɔːrəs/ is a Greek name meaning "Gift of the Sun". Several persons named Heliodorus are known to us from ancient times, the best known of which are:

- Heliodorus (minister) a minister of Seleucus IV Philopator c. 175 BC.
- Heliodorus of Athens an ancient author who wrote fifteen books on the Acropolis of Athens, possibly about 150 BC.
- Heliodorus (ambassador), a Greek ambassador who erected famous votive Heliodorus pillar around 110 BC near Vidisha, Madhya Pradesh, India.
- Heliodorus (metrist) a metrist in the 1st century who did work on the comedies of Aristophanes
- Heliodorus (surgeon) a surgeon in the 1st century, probably from Egypt, and mentioned in the Satires of Juvenal
- Gaius Avidius Heliodorus, 2nd century secretarius ab epistolis and Prefect of Egypt
- Heliodorus of Larissa, c. 3rd century, author of an extant treatise on optics
- Heliodorus of Emesa, 3rd-century Phoenician author of the novel Aethiopica
- Heliodorus (sophist) a 3rd century sophist from Arabia Petraea.
- Heliodorus of Bet Zabdai (died 344), a Syrian bishop and martyr.
- Heliodorus of Altino (died 390), the 4th-century Christian saint.
- Heliodorus of Alexandria the 5th-century Neoplatonist philosopher, and brother of Ammonius Hermiae.
- Heliodorus (6th-century philosopher), an author of a work entitled Commentary.
- Heliodorus of Catania, the 8th-century necromancer and witchdoctor from Catania

== See also ==
- Sergei Trufanov (1880–1952), known as Heliodorus or Iliodor, associate and rival of Rasputin
- Heliodor Píka (1897–1949), a Czechoslovak army officer
- Heliodorus pillar, 2nd-century BC column in Vidisha, India
- Heliodorus stele, 2nd-century BC stele from Maresha, Israel
- Heliodora (disambiguation)
