= Ibn Abdun =

Ibn Abdun may refer to

- Abd al-Majid ibn Abdun, poet
- Muhammad ibn Abdun al-Jabali, physician, mathematician
- Muhammad ibn Ahmad ibn Abdun, legal scholar, author of Risala fi-l-qada wa-l-muhtasib
