= Heliodora (disambiguation) =

Heliodora is an alternate name of Ponometia, a genus of moths of the family Noctuidae.

Heliodora or Heliodore may also refer to:

- Bárbara Heliodora (poet) (c. 1759–1819), Brazilian gold miner and political activist
- Bárbara Heliodora (theatre critic) (1923–2015), Brazilian writer and translator
- Héliodore Côté (b. 1934), Canadian politician
- Heliodora, Minas Gerais, a municipality in Brazil

== See also ==
- Trachydora heliodora, an Australian moth of the family Cosmopterigidae
- Lasippa heliodore, an Indomalayan butterfly of the family Nymphalidae
- Heliodor, a variety of the mineral beryl
- Heliodorus, a given name
