= Archibius =

Archibius (Ancient Greek: Ἀρχίβιος) was the name of several people of classical antiquity:

- Archibius of Alexandria, grammarian who wrote about the epigrams of Callimachus
- Archibius (surgeon), a Greek surgeon of the 1st century CE
- Archibius of Leucas or Alexandria, a grammarian, who taught at Rome in the time of the emperor Trajan, according to the Suda

== See also ==
- Archebius (1st century BCE), an Indo-Greek king who ruled in the area of Taxila, Pakistan
