= Dhu'l-wizaratayn =

Dhu'l-wizaratayn (Arabic: ذو الوزارتين, romanized: ḏū al-wizāratayn, lit. 'possessor of the two vizierates') was an honorific title given to senior ministers in the Islamic world. It can refer to:

- Sa'id ibn Makhlad (died 889), vizier of the Abbasid Caliphate
- Ghalib ibn Abd al-Rahman (c. 900 – 981), vizier of the Umayyad caliphate of Cordoba
- Abu'l-Qasim al-Husayn ibn Ali al-Maghribi (981–1027), vizier of the Fatimid Caliphate, held the augmented form al-kamil dhu'l-wizaratayn ('perfect possessor of the two vizierates')
- Ibn Abi al-Khisal (1072–1146), vizier and secretary of the Almoravid dynasty
- Abu Abdallah ibn al-Hakim (1261–1309), vizier of the Emirate of Granada
- Ibn al-Jayyab (1274–1349), vizier of the Emirate of Granada
- Ibn al-Khatib (1313–1374), vizier of the Emirate of Granada
