= Al-Ghafiqi =

Al-Ghafiqi is a surname. Notable people with the surname include:

- Abdul Rahman Al Ghafiqi, a governor of Al-Andalus
- Muhammad ibn Aslam Al-Ghafiqi, a 12th-century Andalusian oculist and author of The Right Guide to Ophthalmology
- Abū Jaʿfar al-Ghāfiqī, a 12th-century Andalusian Arab botanist, pharmacologist, physician
