= Ibn Abi al-Khisal =

Dhu al-Wizaratayn Ibn Abi al-Khisal
- إبن أبي الخصال
- Born: c. 1072; Las Gorgillitas
- Died: c. 1146; Cordoba

Academic work
- Era: Almoravid, Islamic Golden Age in al-Andalus
- Main interests: History, poetry, hadith
- Notable works: Dhil al-Ghimamah (ظل الغمامة)

Abū ʿAbdallāh Muḥāmmad ibn Masʿūd ibn Ṭayyīb ibn Faraj ibn Khālaṣa (or Khāliṣa) al-Ghāfiqī ash-Sheqūrī (Arabic: أبو عبدالله محمد بن مسعود بن الطيّب بن فرج بن خلاصة الغافقي الشقوري) (d. 540 AH) (d. 1146 AD) better known as Ibn 'Abī'l-Khisāl (إبن أبي الخصال), was a prominent Andalusī secretary, historian, muhaddith (scholar of ḥadīth) and poet. He is referred to as Dhū al-Wizāratayn (ذو الوزارتين; lit. 'holder of two ministerial responsibilities'), an honorific given to senior ministers in medieval Islamic world.

== Biography ==
Ibn 'Abī al-Khisāl was most likely born in 1072 in the village of Las Gorgollitas near Segura de la Sierra, where he spent his early years. His nisba al-Ghāfiqī shows his ethnic association to the Arab tribe of Ghāfiq which settled in 'Andalus after accompanying the army of Mūsā ibn Nusayr (d. 716) that crossed to Iberia. While ash-Sheqūrī indicates his geographical affiliation to the region of Sierra de Segura (in Arabic: شقورة, romanized: shaqura), within modern day Jaén province. After working in the Taīfa courts, he moved to the city of Córdoba, which at the time was under the rule of the Almoravids dynasty. As a Kātib (كاتب; lit. 'Secretary') Ibn 'Abī al-Khisāl worked in the court of the Almoravid governor of Cordoba, Muhāmmad ibn al-Hājj (c. 1090–1106), alongside 'Abū Muhāmmad ibn as-Sīd (1052–1127), a renowned contemporary Kātib. Later in his life, Ibn 'Abī al-Khisāl was appointed as a secretary along with his brother 'Abū Marwān in the court of the Almoravid 'Alī ibn Yūsuf ibn Tāshfīn (r. 1106–1143) at Marrakesh, the capital city of the Almoravids. Ibn 'Abī al-Khisāl would become the most celebrated Kātib among his contemporaries, and was considered the heir to the Andalusi tradition of ornate insha', while also being a respected scholar of Hadīth, earning him the honorific title Dhū'l-wizāratayn, however, no sources specify the exact nature of these two offices. His death occurred in 1146 AD in Cordoba.

== Works ==
According to the historian al-Zirikli, Abi'l-Khisal works includes:

- Tarasuleh wa Shi'reh (ترسله وشعره)
- Dhil al-Ghimamah (ظل الغمامة)
- Minhaj al-Minqab (منهاج المناقب)
- Manaqib al-'Ishrah wa Ami al-Rasul Allah (مناقب العشرة وعمي رسول الله)

== See also ==
- List of pre-modern Arab scientists and scholars
