= Qutb ad-Din Muhammad =

Emir of Sinjar (1197–1219)

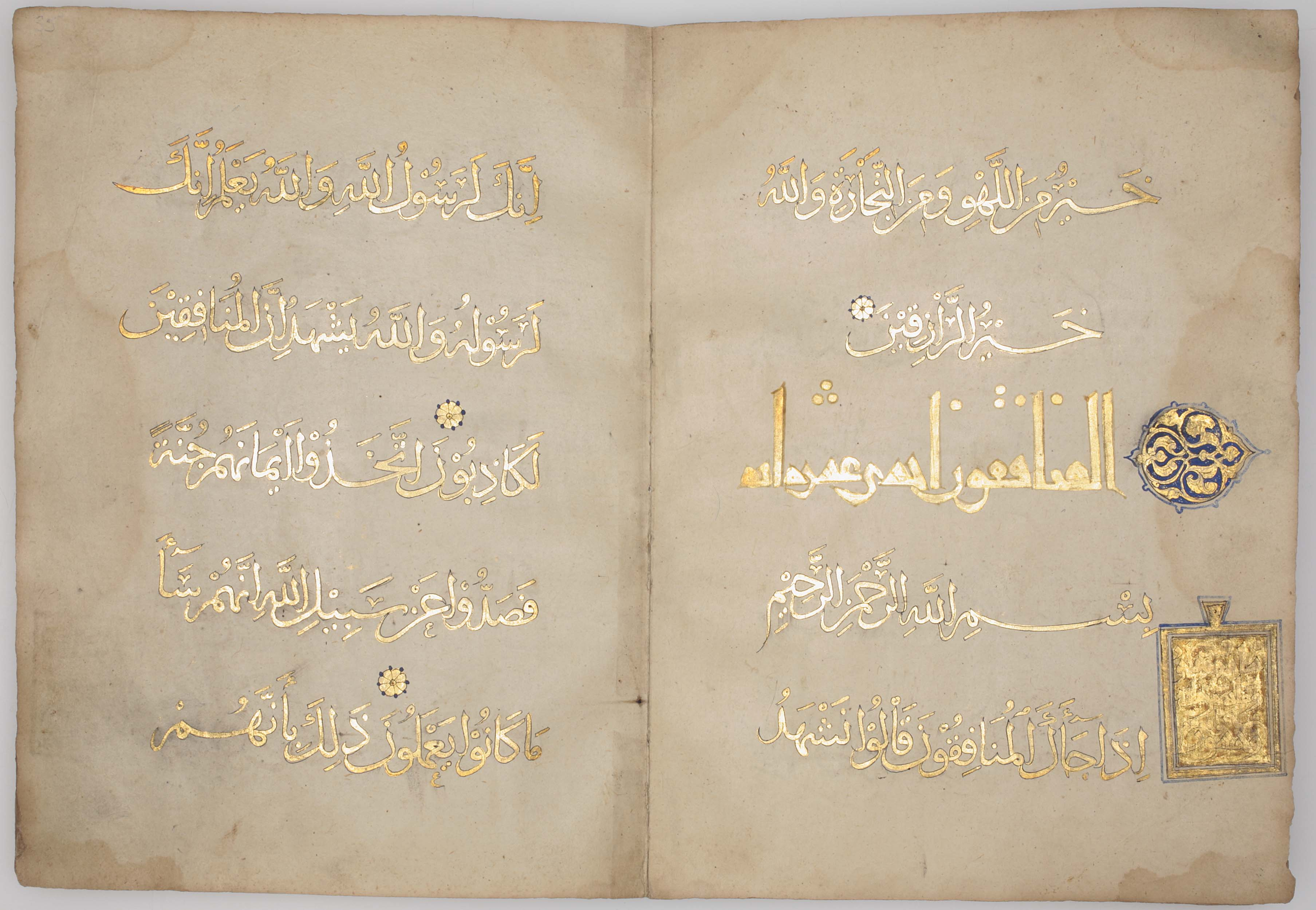
Quran folio created in Sinjar or Nisibin for the library (khizanah) of Qutb al-Din Muhammad, with dedication in his name.

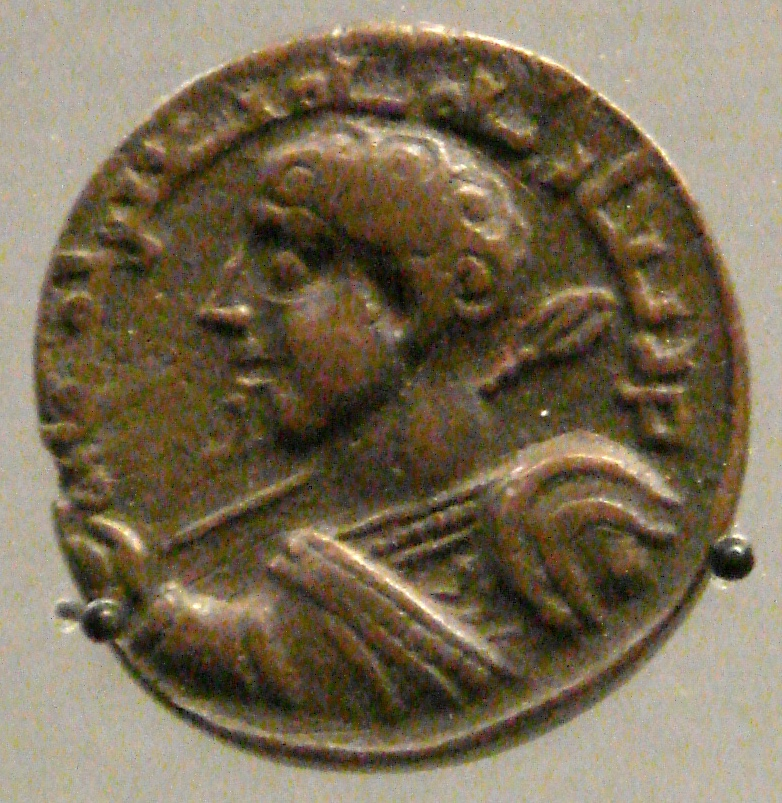
Coin of Qutb al-Din Muhammad, with representation of Roman Emperor Caracalla, mint of Sinjar, 1199.

Qutb ad-Din Muhammad ibn al-Zangi was the Zengid Emir of Sinjar 1197–1219. He was successor of Imad ad-Din Zengi II.

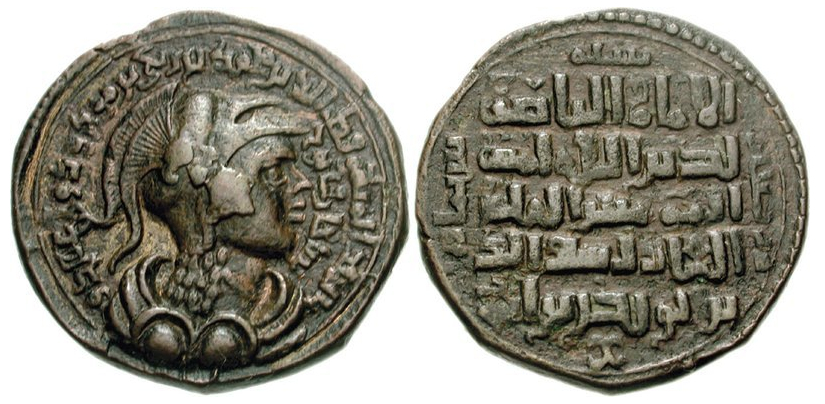
Coin of Qutb al-Din Muhammad ibn al-Zangi, Zengid Atabeg of Sinjar (1197-1219). Sinjar mint. Dated AH 600 (AD 1203-4).

== See also ==
- Zengid dynasty

== Sources ==
- Canby, Sheila R.; Beyazit, Deniz; Rugiadi, Martina; Peacock, A. C. S. (27 April 2016). Court and Cosmos: The Great Age of the Seljuqs. Metropolitan Museum of Art. p. 59, item 9. ISBN 978-1-58839-589-4.

Regnal titles
Preceded by Imad ad-Din Zengi II	Emir of Sinjar; 1197–1219	Succeeded by Imad ad-Din Shahanshah
