= Archibius (surgeon) =

Ancient Greek physician

Archibius (Ancient Greek: Ἀρχίβιος) was a Greek surgeon, of whom no particulars are known, but who must have lived in or before the first century CE, as he is quoted by both Heliodorus and Galen.

The naturalist Pliny the Elder mentions a person of the same name who wrote a superstitious letter to Antiochus, king of Syria; but it is uncertain which king is meant, nor is it known that this Archibius was a physician.
