= Ibn Habal =

Muhadhdhib al-Dīn Abūʼl-Hasan ʻAlī ibn Ahmad Ibn Habal (Arabic: مهذب الدين أبي الحس علي بن أحمد ابن هبل) known as Ibn Habal (Arabic: ابن هَبَل) (c. 1122 - 1213) was an Arab physician and scientist born in Baghdad. He was known primarily for his medical compendium titled Kitab al-Mukhtarat fi al-tibb (Arabic: كتاب المختارات في الطب), "The Book of Selections in Medicine." It was written in 1165 in Mosul, north of Baghdad, where Ibn Hubal spent most of his life.

The chapters on kidney and bladder stones were edited and translated into French by P. de Koning in his Traité sur le calcul dans les reins et dans la vessie (1896). Other chapters have been translated by Dorothee Thies in Die Lehren der arabischen Mediziner Tabari und Ibn Hubal über Herz, Lunge, Gallenblase und Milz (1968).

== See also ==
- List of Arab scientists and scholars
