= Waddah al-Yaman =

Umayyad poet

- وضّاح اليمن
- Born: 7th century Yemen
- Died: 708
- Occupation: Poet
- Writing career
- Language: Arabic
- Notable works: Erotic and romantic poems

Waddah al-Yaman (Arabic: وضّاح اليمن), born Abdul Rahman bin Isma’il al-Khawlani (Arabic: عبدالرحمن بن اسماعيل الخولاني) (died 708), was an Arab poet.

== Biography ==
Al-Yaman was born in Yemen in the second half of the seventh century. He was famous for his erotic and romantic poems.

He was executed by the Umayyad Caliph Al-Walid I, allegedly due to his over familiarity with his wife. Al-Yaman is now regarded as the national poet of Yemen.

== Poetry ==
Excerpt of one of Al-Yaman's poems:

She said: "Don’t come to our home, my father is deadly jealous."

I said: "I’ll pluck you before he knows it, my sword is razor sharp."

She said: "There’s a whole castle between us."

I said: "I’ll fly my flag over the castle."

She said: "There’s a whole sea between us."

I said: "I’m a strong swimmer."

She said: "My seven brothers keep an eye on me."

I said: "I’m a match for them all."

She said: "Allah is watching us."

I said: "My lord is Merciful and Forgiving."

She said: "I have run out of words, so come tonight when everyone’s floating in dreams, and fall on me like dew, undisturbed."

== Resources ==
- Waddah al-Yaman: national poet

== See also ==
- List of Arab scientists and scholars
