= Imad ad-Din Zengi II =

Emir of Sinjar-based Zengid dynasty (died 1197)

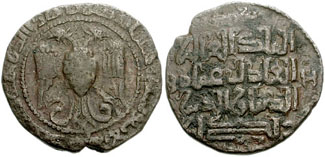
Coinage of Imad al-Din Zengi II. Dated AH 583 (1187-88 CE). Double headed eagle with the name and titles of the Abbasid caliph al Nasir on breast; mint and date around / Four line legend citing Zengi; tamghas at sides.

Abul Fatah Imad al-Din al-Malik al-Adil Zengi Ibn Mawdud (Arabic: أبو الفتح عماد الدين "الملك العادل" زنكي بن مودود; died 1197), better known as Imad al-Din Zengi II, was an emir of the Sinjar-based Zengid dynasty and the first son of Qutb al-Din Mawdud. He ruled from 1171 to 1197 in Sinjar and during 1181–83 in Aleppo.

== Life ==
His father died on 6 September 1170, disinheriting him and designating his second son Sayf al-Din Ghazi II as his successor. Imad al-Din took refuge in Aleppo at the court of Nur al-Din. The latter quickly intervened against Mosul, seizing Sinjar and besieging Mosul, which surrendered on 22 January 1171. Contrary to Imad al-Din's hopes, he maintained control of the city on his own, appointing a vizier there, Gümüshtekin, and left the title of the emir of Mosul to Sayf al-Din. Imad al-Din received Sinjar in compensation.

Sayf al-Din died on 29 June 1180, and appointed his brother Izz al-Din Mas'ud as his successor. He certainly had a son, but he was only twelve years old and the political situation demanded a strong man at the helm of the emirate. Saladin, the vizier of Egypt, refused Nur al-Din's tutelage and then took advantage of the latter's death to seize Damascus and, while seeking to unify the Muslims of Egypt and Syria under his rule, posed a threat to Mosul and Aleppo. On December 4, 1181, his cousin As-Salih Ismail al-Malik, son of Nur al-Din, died without having a son or brother and appointed Izz al-Din Mas'ud to succeed him, against the law and opinion of his advisors who proposed Imad al-Din. Following the affirmations of his brother Izz al-Din, he preferred to exchange Sinjar for Aleppo with Imad al-Din.

In November 1182, Saladin, seeking to unify Muslim Syria under his rule, laid siege to Mosul, but the Muslim princes, concerned about Saladin's ambitions, formed a coalition that forced him to lift the siege. He then turned in May 1183 against Aleppo and besieged the city. The city is said to be impregnable, its inhabitants and defenders did not hesitate to raid Saladin's army and Imad al-Din was able to call on his brother Izz al-Din Mas'ud or the Franks to force Saladin to lift the siege, but he preferred to negotiate and concluded on June 12, 1183, the exchange of Aleppo for the cities of Sinjar, Nisibis, Al-Khabur, Ar-Raqqah, and Seruj. Imad al-Din Zengi left the city to the boos of the Aleppo people, who had always been loyal to the Zengids and who were ashamed of their emir's resignation.

In June 1190, he responded with one of his nephews from Mosul to Saladin's call for jihad against the Crusaders besieging Acre. In 1193, taking advantage of Saladin's death, Imad al-Din and his brother Izz al-Din Mas'ud attempted to shake off Ayyubid tutelage, but Izz al-Din Mas'ud's death soon after put an end to this attempt. Imad al-Din died at Sinjar in the month of November or December 1197.

== Legacy ==
Imad al-Din had a son named Qutb ad-Din Muhammad (died 1219) from his unknown wife, who succeeded him.
