= Mehjaa ibn Saleh =

Yemeni Muslim soldier (d. 624)

Mehjaa' ibn Saleh
- مهجع بن صالح
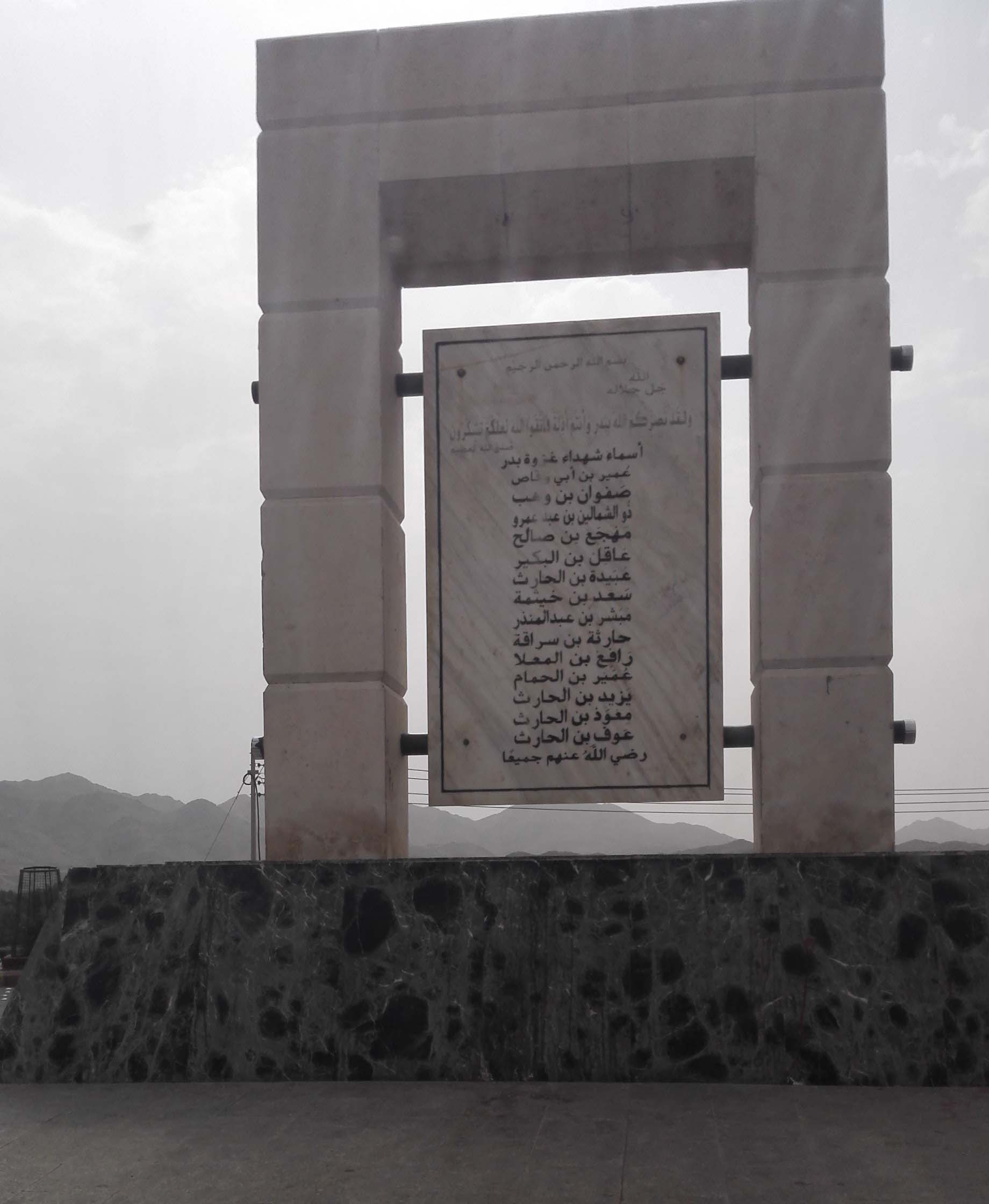
- The names of the martyrs who were slain in the Battle of Badr, on a commemorative plaque; including Mehjaa' ibn Saleh
- Died: 624 CE; Badr, Hijaz region of Saudi Arabia
- Known for: Being one of Muhammad's companions

Mehjaa' ibn Saleh (Arabic: مهجع بن صالح, d. 624 CE) was a Sahaba from the tribe of Banu 'Akk. Mehjaa' participated in the Battle of Badr and was reportedly the first of the Muslims to have been killed in action.

== Biography ==
Mehjaa' ibn Salih was of Yemeni descent. Muslim scholar Ibn Hajar states that he was descended from the Yemeni Banu 'Akk tribe. Mehjaa' was taken into captivity by the Quraysh when he was in Mecca, but was eventually freed by Umar ibn al-Khattab who had converted to Islam.

=== Death ===
Mehjaa' was amongst the Muslim fighters in the Battle of Badr. He was killed by a polytheist named 'Amir ibn al-Hadhrami. Mehjaa' left no descendants.

== Legacy ==
Mehjaa' is honoured and remembered by Muslims as the first Muslim casualty in the Battle of Badr. He was buried in a plot of land adjacent to the battlefield, that is currently not accessible to the public. Today a memorial bearing the names of the martyred individuals stands near the site of the Battle of Badr.

Some Muslim scholars stated the Qur'anic verse 6:52 was revealed about him;

- ۝˹O Prophet!˺ Do not dismiss those ˹poor believers˺ who invoke their Lord morning and evening, seeking His pleasure. You are not accountable for them whatsoever, nor are they accountable for you. So do not dismiss them, or you will be one of the wrongdoers.

== See also ==
- List of Sahaba
