= Sulaiman Al Mahri =

Arab navigator

Sulaymān al-Mahrī
- سليمان المهري
- Born: 1480; Shihr, Hadhramaut, Yemen
- Died: 1550 (aged 69–70)
- Occupations: Navigator, Writer
- Writing career
- Language: Arabic
- Notable work: al-ʿUmda al-mahriyya fī ḍabṭ al-ʿulūm al-baḥriyya

Sulaymān ibn Aḥmad ibn Sulaymān al-Mahrī (Arabic: سليمان بن أحمد بن سليمان المهري) (ca. 1480–1550) was a 16th-century Arab navigator. He came from Shihr, in Hadhramaut, eastern Yemen, and he was called “al-Mahrī” because he was a descendant of the Arabic tribe of Mahra. His work continues and expands the work of Ibn Majid, though there is no explicit relation between them in any of their works.

== Works ==
- al-ʿUmda al-mahriyya fī ḍabṭ al-ʿulūm al-baḥriyya (Al-Mahrī’s Pillar on the Exactitude of Maritime Sciences)
- al-Minhāj al-Fākhir fī ʿIlm al-Baḥr al-Zākhir (The Precious Method on the Science of the Rising Sea)
- Tuḥfat al-Fuḥūl fī Tamhīd al-Uṣūl ʿIlm al-Baḥr (The Worthy Men’s Gift on the Introduction to the Principles of Maritime Science)
- Sharḥ Tuḥfat al-Fuḥūl fī Tamhīd al-Uṣūl ʿIlm al-Baḥr (A Commentary to The Worthy Men’s Gift on the Introduction to the Principles of Maritime Science)
- Qilādat al-Shumūs wa-Istikhrāj Qawāʾid al-Usūs (Necklace of Suns and the Calculation of the Rules of the Bases)
- Mirʾāt al-Salāk li-Kurāt al-Aflāk (Mirror of Travellers into the Heavenly Spheres)

Al-Mahrī is known for reducing Ibn Majids's list of stars for navigation from 70 to 15. Combinations of these lists of stars were used by Arab navigators and mariners up to the early 16th century.

In his treatises, al-Mahri noted the islands off the west coast of Siam (Malaya). The most important destination covered by these navigational texts is Malacca, which had become the region's principal trading center for Arab navigators during the 15th century. Singapore, parts of Samarra, Java, China, the coasts of Burma and Andaman and Nicobar Islands were the focal points of his texts.

He grouped the shores of Malaya with Siam, and the mainland to the east with China as a single kingdom. This passage from al-Mahri’s book illustrates the limits of Arab navigators:

Know that to the south of the Island of Java are found many Islands called Timor and that to the east of Timor are the Islands of Bandam, also a large number. The latter are places of sandalwood, aloeswood and mace. These islands are called Isles of Clove as airs of Jawa are called Maluku islands.

Since many of the islands have not been identified with confidence, the extent of his travel and familiarity with the region is not known.

Al Mahri's division of Andaman and Nicobar Islands into two parts helped Arab and Portuguese navigators. Even in the mid-16th century Sidi Ali Çelebī translated parts of al-Mahri’s texts into Turkish.

With the exception oh his astronomical treatise, Mir’at al-salāk li-kurāt al-aflāk, all his works were first published in Arabic by Ibrahim Khoury in Damascus, 1971, as part of the four-volume collection Al-ʿUlūm al-baḥrīyah ʿinda al-ʿarab (Maritime Sciences Among the Arabs).

== See also ==
- Islamic scholars
- List of Arab scientists and scholars
