= Al-Muwatta =

8th-century Islamic hadith collection

Muwatta Imam Malik
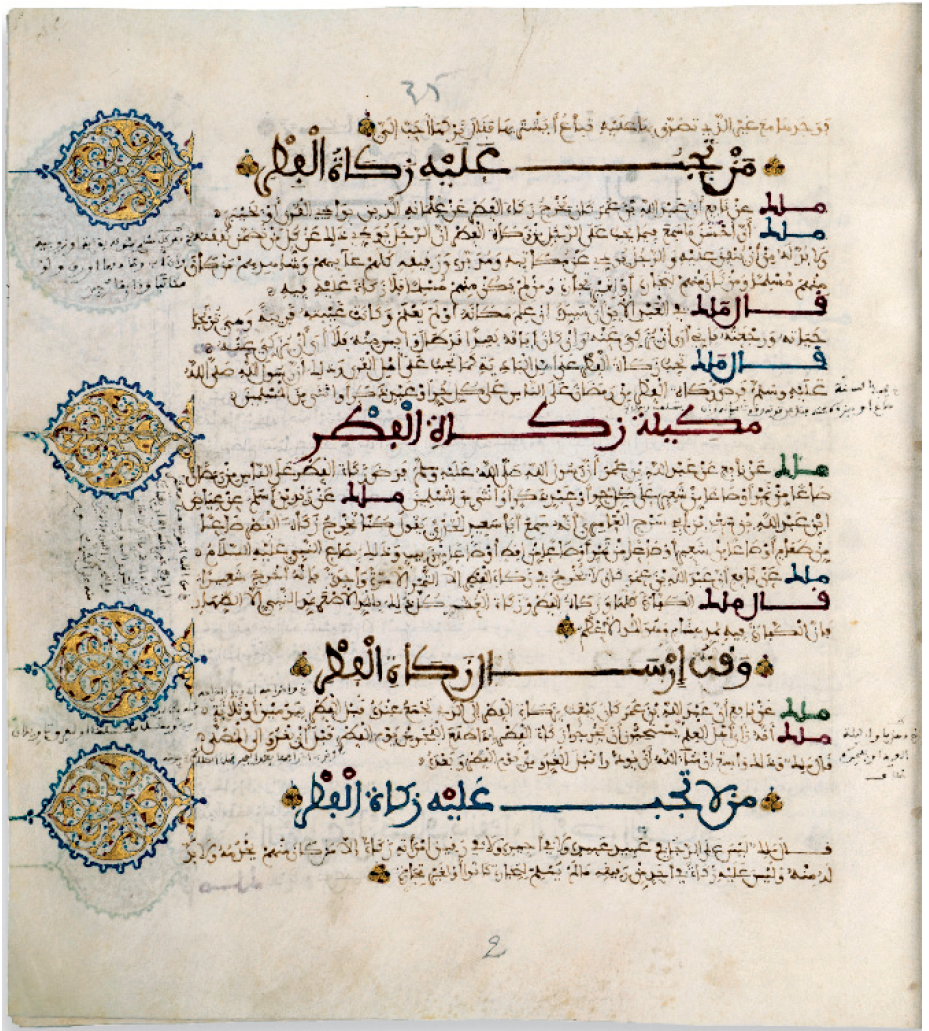
- Marinid manuscript of the Muwatta, dated 1326 CE
- Author: Imam Malik ibn Anas
- Original title: موطأ الإمام مالك
- Language: Arabic
- Genre: Hadith collection

Al-Muwaṭṭaʾ (Arabic: الموطأ, 'the well-trodden path') or Muwatta Imam Malik (Arabic: موطأ الإمام مالك) of Imam Malik (711–795), written in the 8th century, is one of the earliest collections of hadith texts comprising the subjects of Islamic law, compiled by Malik ibn Anas. It is also the earliest extant example of a musannaf, a genre of hadith compilation that arranges hadith topically.

Malik's best-known work, Al-Muwatta, was the first legal work to incorporate and combine hadith and fiqh.

== Description ==
It is considered to be from the earliest extant collections of hadith that form the basis of Islamic jurisprudence alongside the Qur'an. It includes reliable hadith from the people of the Hijaz, as well as sayings of the companions, the followers and also those who came after them. The book covers rituals, rites, customs, traditions, norms and laws of the time of the Islamic prophet Muhammad.

It is reported that Imam Malik selected for inclusion into the Muwatta just over 1900 narrations, from the 100,000 narrations he had available to him.

== History ==
“O Abū ‘Abd Allāh, take up the reign of the discipline of fiqh in your hands. Compile your understanding of every issue in different chapters for a systematic book free from the harshness of ‘Abd Allāh b. ‘Umar, concessions and accommodations of ‘Abd Allāh b. ‘Abbās and unique views of ‘Abd Allāh b. Mas‘ūd. Your work should exemplify the following principle of the Prophet: “The best issues are those which are balanced.” It should be a compendium of the agreed upon views of the Companions and the elder imāms on the religious and legal issues. Once you have compiled such a work then we would be able to unite the Muslims in following the single fiqh worked by you. We would then promulgate it in the entire Muslim state. We would order that no body acts contrary to it.”

Historical reports attest that another ‘Abbāsī caliph Harun al-Rashid too expressed similar wishes before Imām Mālik who remained unmoved. He, however, compiled Muwaṭṭa’, keeping before himself the target of removing the juristic differences between the scholars.

== Authenticity ==
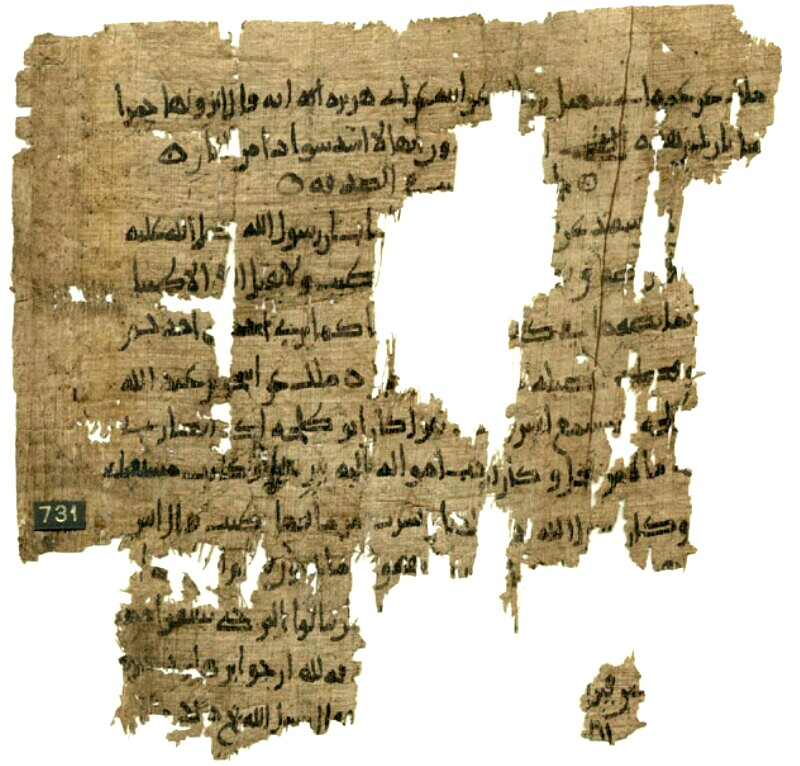
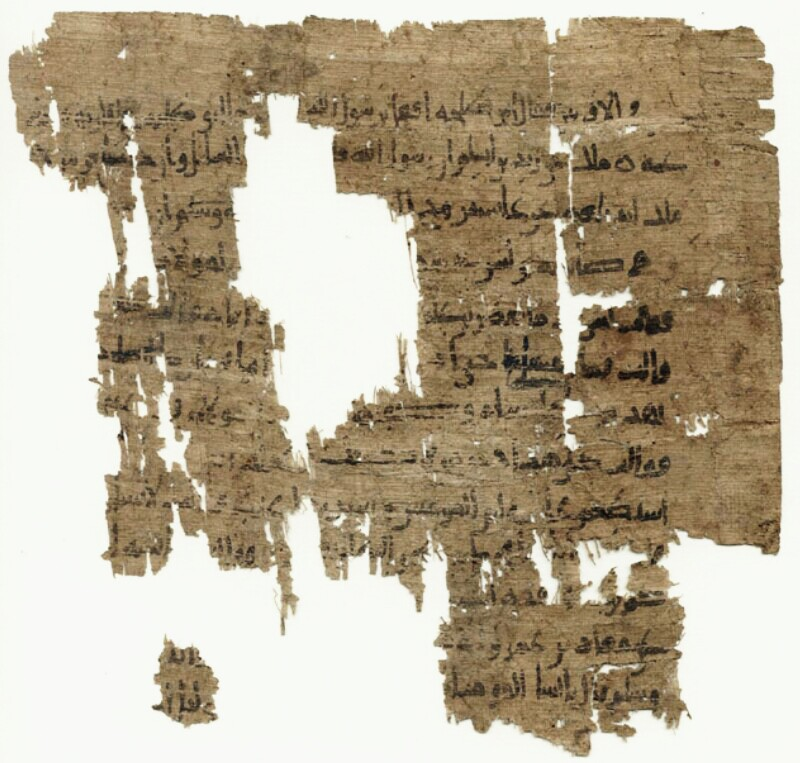
PERF No. 731, the earliest manuscript of Mālik's Muwaṭṭaʾ, dated to his own time. Recto (left) has the contents of Bāb al-Targib fī-Sadaqah.

The work was composed over a forty-year period. According to Abu Hatim al-Razi it was called 'Muwatta' from the Arabic ("watta'a") meaning easy for the people. Malik said, "I showed this book of mine to seventy of the fuqaha of Madinah and all of them agreed with me ("wata'a") about it and so I called it the Muwatta.

The Muslim Jurist, Muhammad ibn Idris ash-Shafi`i also called Imam Al Shafi`i famously said, "There is not on the face of the earth a book – after the Book of Allah – which is more authentic than the book of Malik."

Over one thousand disciples of Malik have transmitted this work from him throughout his life, which resulted in differences in the text. There are many editions of the work - with sixteen being known today - of which the most famous is the one transmitted by Yahya ibn Yahya al-Laythi, who studied and received the Muwatta in the last year of Malik's life. Al-Laythi's recension is considered the 'vulgate' or standard version in the Maliki school of law.

The recension of the Muwatta produced by Ahmad ibn Abi Bakr al-Zuhri is approximately five to ten percent larger than the recension of al-Laythi.

== Composition of al-Muwatta ==
Al-Muwatta consists of approximately 1,720 hadith divided amongst the following hadith terminology as follows:

- 600 marfu` hadith
- 613 mawquf hadith
- 285 maqtu' hadith
- 222 mursal hadiths

== Distinguishing characteristics ==
Amin Ahsan Islahi has listed several distinguishing characteristics of the Muwatta:

1. Its brevity in size yet comprehensiveness in coverage.
2. Malik did not accept any marfū‘ hadīth (ascribed to the Prophet) unless it was a verbatim transmission of the words of the Islamic prophet Muhammad (he even gave consideration to letters, prepositions, and particles such as wāw, tā, and bā in them).
3. No acceptance of hadith from any innovator — this is a stricter standard than that of many other muhaddithun.
4. A highly literary form of classical Arabic, which helps readers develop the ability to understand the language of prophetic traditions.

== Commentaries on Al-Muwatta ==
Due to the importance of the Al-Muwatta to Muslims it has often been accompanied by commentaries, mostly but not exclusively by followers of the Maliki school. It's said that on the version transmitted by Yahya al-Laithi alone there are around a hundred commentaries.

- Al Tamhid by Yusuf ibn Abd al-Barr is organized according to the narrators which Malik narrates from, and includes extensive biographical information about each narrator in the chain.
- al-Istidhkar, also by Ibn Abd al-Barr is more of a legal exegesis on the hadith contained in the book than a critical hadith study, as was the case with the former. It is said that the Istidhkar was written after the Tamhid, as Ibn Abd al Barr himself alludes to in the introduction. However, through close examination it is apparent that the author made revisions to both after their completion due to the cross referencing found in both.
- Kitab al-Qabas fi Sharh Muwatta Malik ibn Anas by Abu Bakr ibn al-Arabi. It is considered one of the best commentaries done on Muwatta Malik.
- The explanation of Al-Suyuti, who although a follower of the Shafi`i school, wrote a small commentary to the Al-Muwatta.
- Al-Musaffa Sharh al-Muwatta, Shah Wali Allah Dahlawi (al-Musaffa Sharh al-Muwatta in Persian). Shah Waliullah attached great importance to the Muwatta and penned another commentary in Urdu too.
- Al-Muntaqâ sharh al-Muwatta of Abu al-Walid al-Baji, the Andalusian Mâlikî Qâdî, (Abû al-Walîd Sulaymân ibn Khalaf al-Bâjî, al-Muntaqâ sharh Muwatta’ Mâlik, edited by Muhammad ‘Abd al-Qâdir Ahmad ‘Atâ, Beirut: Dâr al-Kutub al-‘Ilmiyyah, 1420/1999) Sharh al-Muwatta' has two versions: al-Istifa' and its abridgment al-Muntaqa.
- Awjāz-ul-Masālik ilá Muwattā' Imām Mālik is a Deobandi commentary written by great scholar Muhammad Zakariya al-Kandahlawi. He began the work in 1927 in Medina while only 29 years old. It is said regarding this commentary that Muhammad Ibn Al-Hasan Al-Alawi Al-Māliki said after reading this book that if the author did not mention in the introduction that he is a Hanafi I would not have known. Such was the brilliance of this work. It is also said that upon seeing the commentary, the Maliki scholars said, Qad Hannafal Muwatta, as a word of praise (meaning: that Shaykh Zakariya al-Kandahlawi wrote the book Awjāz-ul-Masālik ilá Muwattā' Imām Mālik in such a way that it seems like the Muwatta has become a Hanafi book).
- Sharh Muwatta al-Malik by Muhammad al-Zurqani. It is considered to be based on three other commentaries of the Muwatta; the Tamhid and the Istidhkar of Yusuf ibn Abd al Barr, as well as the Al-Muntaqa of Abu al-Walid al-Baji.
- Al-Imla' fi Sharh al-Muwatta in 1,000 folios, by Ibn Hazm.
- Sharh Minhaaj by Subki.
- Sharh Muwatta by Ali al-Qari

== See also ==
- Abu Hatim Ahmad ibn Hamdan al-Razi, died 322 AH (933/934 CE), Ismaili philosopher
- Abu Hatim Muhammad ibn Idris al-Razi, AH 195–277 (811−890 CE), hadith scholar and Athari theologian
- List of Sunni books
  - Sahifah Hammam ibn Munabbih
