= Rashid al-Din al-Suri =

Islamic physician and botanist (1177–1241)

Rashidun al-Suri

Personal life
- Born: 1177 CE
- Died: 1241 CE
- Era: Ayyubid
- Region: Egypt and Syria
- Main interest(s): Medicine, Botany
- Notable work: al-Adwiyat al-Mufradah

Religious life
- Religion: Islam

Rashid al-Din al-Suri (Arabic: رشيد الدين الصوري, romanized: Rashid ad-din as-Sury, 1177–1241) was a leading physician and botanist in the Islamic world in the 13th century. He served the leading figures of the Ayyubid dynasty.

== Biography ==
Al-Suri was born and brought up in Tyre, then part of the Crusader-ruled Lebanon and derives his name al-Suri from the name of the city in Arabic "Sur". After completing his preliminary education in Tyre, he moved to Jerusalem, under Ayyubid control, where he served as a physician at a hospital. He later met and greatly impressed the Ayyubid sultan al-Adil in the early 13th century. Al-Adil brought al-Suri to Cairo and made him his personal physician. He also served al-Adil's son, al-Mu'azzam and grandson, an-Nasir Dawud, the successive governors of Damascus.

Besides medicine, al-Suri held an interest for plant life and was a botany researcher. He used to roam about and study herbs and plants in their natural surroundings. He employed a professional painter to sketch and paint for him the plants in different stages of their growth as specific as possible by the use of various colors and dyes. His book, entitled al-Adwiyat al-Mufradah ("The Simple Medicines") is not extant.

== Bibliography ==
- Ali, Abdul (1996), Islamic Dynasties of the Arab East: State and Civilization During the Later Medieval Times, M.D. Publications Pvt. Ltd, ISBN 978-81-7533-008-5
