= Abu'l Abbas al-Hijazi =

12th-century Arab merchant and traveler in China

- Native name: أبوالعباس الحجازي
- Born: 12th century Yemen
- Occupation: Traveler, Merchant, Sailor
- Notable works: Known for his extensive travels and trade in China

Abu'l Abbas al-Hijazi (Arabic: أبوالعباس الحجازي), was a 12th-century Arab Muslim traveler, merchant and sailor and is known to have spent forty years in China. His seven sons whom he positioned in seven different commercial centers from his base in Yemen, enhanced his trading business by sending goods from foreign markets. He had lost 10 ships in the Indian Ocean but recovered his fortunes when his 11th ship safely arrived from China which carried porcelain and aloewood.
