= Yahya ibn Yahya al-Laythi =

Andalusian Muslim scholar (died 848)

- يحيى بن يحيى الليثي
- Born: ca. 769 (152 AH); Algeciras, Emirate of Córdoba
- Died: ca. 848 / (234 AH) (age 78–79 years); Córdoba, Spain, Emirate of Córdoba
- Occupation: writer
- Writing career
- Subjects: spreading the Maliki school of jurisprudence in Al-Andalus

Abu Muhammad Yahya ibn Yahya ibn Kathir ibn Wislasen ibn Shammal ibn Mangaya al-Laythi (Arabic: يحيى بن يحيى الليثي) (born: 769 / died: 848), better known as Yahya ibn Yahya, was an Andalusian scholar and hadith specialist. He is widely known for spreading the Maliki school of jurisprudence in Islamic Spain. Yahya is considered the most important transmitter of Imam Maliks' Muwatta.

== Biography ==
Yahya was born in the area of Algeciras to the Banu Abi Isa family. His grandfather, Abu Isa Kathir, the eponymous of the family, was a Masmuda Berber soldier and a mawla of the Banu Layth of Kinana, thus the nisba al-Laythi. Abd al-Rahman I rewarded Kathir by giving him the governorship of Algeciras, then Sidonia and later again Algeciras, where he died and was buried.

Yahya ibn Yahya travelled to the East at a young age and studied with Malik ibn Anas, becoming an ardent follower of his. Al-Andalus in his time was dominated by the followers of imam al-Awza'i – due to the fact that most Arabic Muslim conquerors came from Syria – beside different other schools of Jurisprudence according to imam al-Dhahabi in his tarikh al-Islam al-Kabir when mentioning Yayha's teacher Shabtun (Zaid ibn Abdarrahman al-Lakhmi). Returning to Al-Andalus, he focused on his scholarly work. As a member of the shura (the advisory board that the emir and judges had to consult), he had an enormous influence on the nomination of legal positions. Still, he himself never accepted a legal position. In his role as member of the shura he became close to the ruler of Al-Andalus, who was apparently impressed with his intelligence and authority on Islamic matters. He thus grew to become the most influential member of the shura, giving him the opportunity to nominate judges who also favored the Maliki school. At the end of his life, the Maliki school was the most important in Al-Andalus.

At one point he was accused of taking part in a rising, after which he fled Cordoba to live amongst the Masmuda tribes near Toledo. He was pardoned by emir Al-Hakam I and allowed to return.

His descendants became one of the greatest families of the 9th and 10th centuries, due in part to the fame of their ancestor. But among them personalities with their own light also appear, who maintain the power and influence of the family due to their individual merits.

== His place in Andalusia ==
Yahya bin Yahya was one of those who published the doctrine of Malik in Andalusia, and to him the presidency of the doctrine ended in it, Malik described it as the sane of Andalusia, promised by Muhammad bin Abdullah bin.

He was accused of rejoicating people against Al-Rabdi Ruling, which resulted in Al-Rabadah incident, which almost ended the rule of the ruling in Andalusia. However, it was great for the princes of the sons of Umayya in Andalusia, he stated Ibn Bashkuwal that he answered the invitation, and that the Prince of Andalusia did not When the jurists came out, they asked him: "you didn't miss it with the test", and he said: "If we opened this door on it, it was easy for him to step on every day and free a neck, but I carried him on the most difficult things so that he would not return."

He mentioned Ibn Abd al-Barr that the boy became to him in Andalusia after Issa bin Dinar. Yahya bin Yahya died in Córdoba, Spain, and was buried there on Rajab 22, 234 AH.
