= Ahmad ibn Abi Bakr al-Zuhri =

9th-century Maliki Muslim scholar

Personal life
- Born: 767 CE Medina, Arabia
- Died: 856 CE Medina, Arabia
- Era: 8th-9th century
- Main interest: Islamic jurisprudence
- Notable idea: Recension of Malik ibn Anas' Kitāb al-Muwaṭṭaʾ
- Known for: Student of Malik ibn Anas, author of al-Mukhtaṣar fī al-fiqh
- Occupation: Scholar, Judge (Qadi)

Religious life
- Religion: Islam
- Creed: Maliki

Senior posting
- Influenced by: Malik ibn Anas

Abū Muṣʿab Aḥmad ibn Abī Bakr al-Qāsim ibn al-Ḥārith al-Zuhri (Arabic: أبو مصعب أحمد بن أبي بكر القاسم بن الحارث الزهري), 767–856 CE / 150–242 AH, was a Muslim scholar and judge (qadi) who was a student of Malik ibn Anas.

He was born and lived in Medina, where he wrote a work called al-Mukhtaṣar fī al-fiqh ('The Epitome on Fiqh'), as well as a recension of Malik ibn Anas' Kitāb al-Muwaṭṭaʾ. He was dismissed from his position as qadi by Qutham ibn Ja'far in 210 AH (825/826 CE). In his judicial opinions (fatwas), he relied not only on hadith reports, but also on rational discretion (raʾy).

Abū Muṣʿab's recension of the Kitāb al-Muwaṭṭaʾ is approximately five to ten percent larger than the recension of Yahya ibn Yahya al-Laythi, which is considered the 'vulgate' or standard version in the Maliki school of law.

== Sources ==
=== Primary ===
- ʿAwwād Maʿrūf, Bashshār [in German]; Muḥammad Khalīl, Maḥmūd (1991). al-Muwaṭṭaʾ li-imām dār al-hijra Mālik ibn Anas. Riwāyat Abī Muṣʿab al-Zuhrī al-Madanī. Vol. 1–2. Beirut: Mu’assasat al-Risāla.

=== Secondary ===
- Brockopp, Jonathan E. (2000). Early Mālikī Law: Ibn ‘Abd al-ḥakam and his Major Compendium of Jurisprudence. Studies in Islamic Law and Society. Vol. 14. Leiden: Brill. ISBN 978-90-04-11628-3.
- Sezgin, Fuat (1967). Geschichte des arabischen Schrifttums, Band I: Qur'ānwissenschaften, ḥadīṯ, Geschichte, Fiqh, Dogmatik, Mystik. Bis ca. 430 H. Leiden: Brill. pp. 132–269. ISBN 978-90-04-02007-8.
