= Heliodorus (sophist) =

For other people with this name, see Heliodorus

Heliodorus, (Greek: Ἡλιόδωρος) sometimes known as Heliodorus the Arab was an ancient sophist of Arab origin. He became prominent in the 3rd century CE.

Heliodorus is known to be from the Roman province of Arabia Petraea. Although little is known about him, Greek sophist Philostratus in his work Lives of the Sophists (Βίοι Σοφιστῶν) mentioned that sophist Heliodorus made a strong impression on the Roman Emperor Caracalla.
