= Sinjar =

Sinjar سنجار
- Town
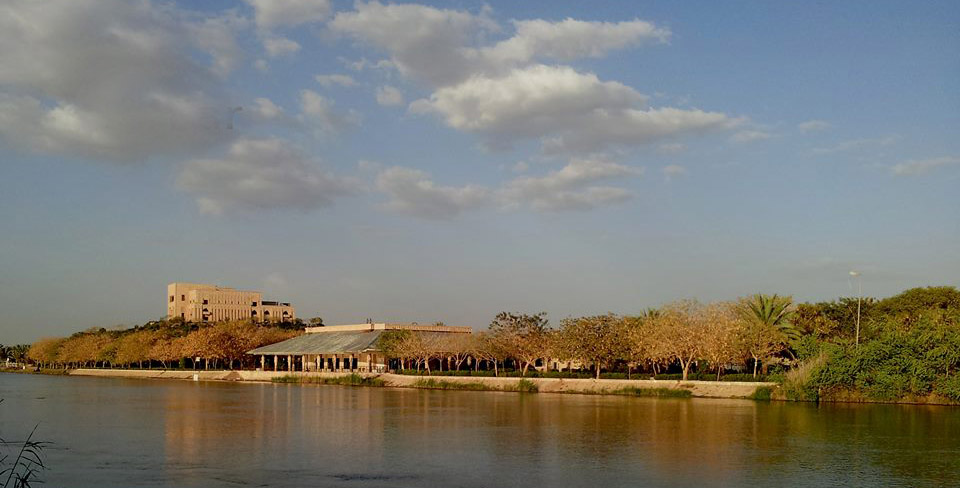
- Sinjar in 2019

- Location within Iraq Location within Near East
- Coordinates: 36°19′21″N 41°51′51″E
- Country: Iraq
- Governorate: Nineveh
- District: Sinjar District

Government
  - Mayor: Fahad Hamid Omar
- Elevation: 522 m (1,713 ft)

Population (2013)
  - Total: 88,023
- Time zone: UTC+3 (GMT)

Sinjar (Arabic: سنجار, romanized: Sinjār; Kurdish: شنگال, romanized: Şingal, Syriac: ܫܝܓܪ, romanized: Shingar) is a town in the Sinjar District of the Nineveh Governorate in northern Iraq. It is located about five kilometers south of the Sinjar Mountains. Its population in 2013 was estimated at 88,023, and is predominantly Yazidi.

== History ==
=== Antiquity ===
A map of the Jazira (Upper Mesopotamia) province in the early Islamic era

In the 2nd century AD, Sinjar became a military base called Singara and part of the Roman limes. It remained part of the Roman Empire until it was sacked by the Sasanians in 360. Starting in the late 5th century, the mountains around Sinjar became an abode of the Banu Taghlib, an Arab tribe. At the beginning of 6th century, a tribe called Qadišaiē (Kαδίσηνοι), who were of either Kurdish or Arab origin, dwelt there. The Qadišaye practiced idolatry. According to the early Islamic literary sources, Singara had long been a bone of contention between the Sasanian and Byzantine empires and several times switched hands between the two empires. A 6th-century source describes the population of Singara as being composed of Pagans, Christians and Jews. There are few visible traces of the ancient town of Singara.

=== Islamic era ===
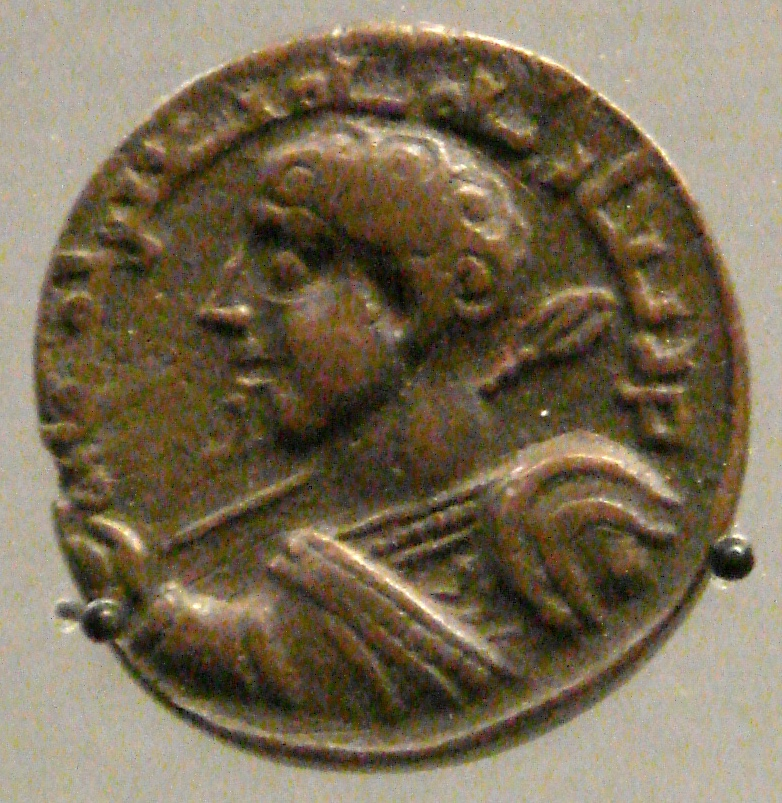
Coin of Qutb al-Din, the Zengid ruler of Sinjar in 1197–1219, with representation of Roman Emperor Caracalla, Sinjar mint 1199.

Sinjar was conquered in the 630s–640s by the Arab Muslims led by the commander Iyad ibn Ghanm and thereafter incorporated into the Diyar Rabi'a district of the Jazira province. In 970, the city was conquered by the Hamdanid dynasty, a branch of the Banu Taghlib tribe. Toward the end of the century, another Arab dynasty, the Uqaylids captured the city and erected a citadel there. Beginning with the rule of the Turkmen atabeg Jikirmish in 1106/07, Sinjar entered its most prosperous historical period lasting through the mid-13th century. The Zengid ruler Nur ad-Din conquered the area in 1169 and 1171; in the latter year, a cadet branch of the Zengids was established in Sinjar under Zengi II (r. 1171–1197), whose court was noted for its high culture. The scholar Ibn Shaddad (d. 1186) noted that Sinjar was protected by a double wall, the first being the original wall built by the Uqaylids and the newer wall built by the local Zengid ruler Qutb ad-Din Muhammad (r. 1197–1219). Also noted by Ibn Shaddad were two mosques, six madrasas (schools of Islamic law) for the Hanafi and Shafi'i schools of jurisprudence, a mashhad (shrine) dedicated to Ali ibn Abi Talib and three khanqas (buildings for Sufi gatherings) and Ibn al-Adim (d. 1262) further notes a zawiya (Sufi lodge). A surviving mosque minaret from this era, remarked on by the 19th-century epigraphist Max van Berchem, contains an inscription crediting Qutb ad-Din as the minaret's builder in 1201.

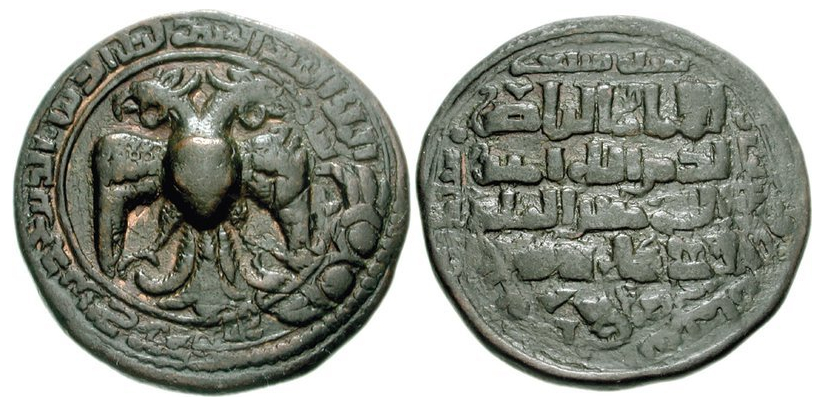
Coin of Qutb al-Din Muhammad bin Zengi, Zengid Atabeg of Sinjar (1197–1219). Sinjar mint. Dated AH 607 (AD 1210-1).

The city came under Ayyubid rule during the reign of Saladin and was controlled by the Ayyubid ruler of the Diyar Bakr district of the Jazira, al-Ashraf Muzaffar al-Din (r. 1210–1220). It later was controlled by the ruler of Mosul, Badr al-Din Lu'lu'. The Ilkhanid Mongols destroyed the double wall of Sinjar and the mashhad of Ali in 1262; the mashhad was rebuilt afterward by the Ilkhanid's Persian governor of the area Muhammad al-Yazdi. Ibn al-Adim and al-Dhahabi (d. 1348) list several Islamic scholars who hailed from Sinjar, including the polymath Ibn al-Akfani (d. 1348). The geographer Zakariya al-Qazwini (d. 1283) referred to Sinjar as "little Damascus", noting in particular the similarities of Sinjar's ornate bathhouses with their mosaic-laced floors and walls and octagonal stone pools. During his visit of the city, Ibn Battuta (d. 1369) mentioned that the inhabitants of the city were Kurds, whom he describes as "brave and generous". He also remarked that Sinjar's congregational mosque was encircled by a perennial stream.

The Timurid successors of the Ilkhanids captured Sinjar after a seven-month siege according to oral traditions cited by Evliya Çelebi (d. 1682). The city was later conquered successively by the Turkmen tribes of Ak Koyunlu and Kara Koyunlu before being taken by the Safavid dynasty of Iran in 1507/08. During the Ottoman–Safavid War (1532–1555), Sinjar was captured by the Constantinople (Istanbul)-based Ottoman Empire in 1534. The city became the center of its own sanjak (district) within Diyarbekir Eyalet (province of Diyarbakir). It was later reduced to being the administrative center of its own nahiya (subdistrict) of the Mardin Sanjak. Writing in the 17th century, Evliya Çelebi noted that the population of the city of Sinjar was composed of Kurds and Arabs from the Banu Tayy tribe, while the Sinjar Mountains were inhabited by 45,000 Yazidi and Baburi Kurds.

After 1830, the nahiya of Sinjar became part of the Mosul Sanjak. In 1833, Mir Muhammad of Rawanduz massacred as many as 10,000 Yazidi men on the mound of Koyunjik. Following this Reşid Mehmed Pasha campaigned against Sinjar, reportedly destroying three fourths of the population. The Ottomans after a second massacre, carried off more than thirty thousand into slavery, Yazidi girls were sold at the Black sea for thirty piastre." During the 19th century, the Yazidis of the Sinjar Mountains often posed a threat to travelers in the region. The governor Dawud Pasha of Baghdad (in office in 1816–1831) was unable to suppress the Yazidis and the Yazidi revolts of 1850–1864 were ended after the diplomatic efforts of the Ottoman statesman Midhat Pasha enabled the authorities to tax and impose customs in the area.

== Modern era ==
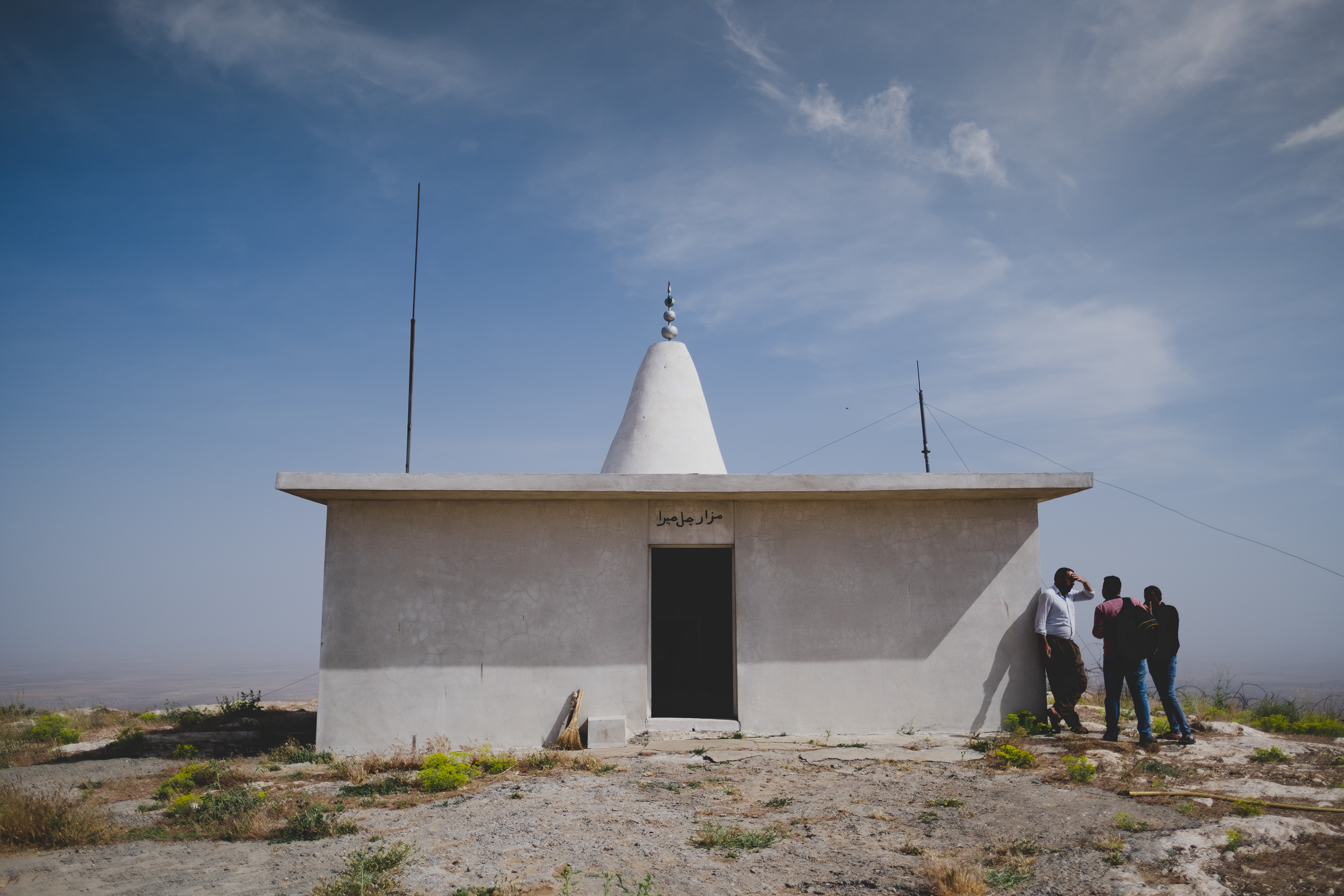
The important Chermera temple (meaning '40 Men') is found on the highest peak of the Sinjar Mountains.

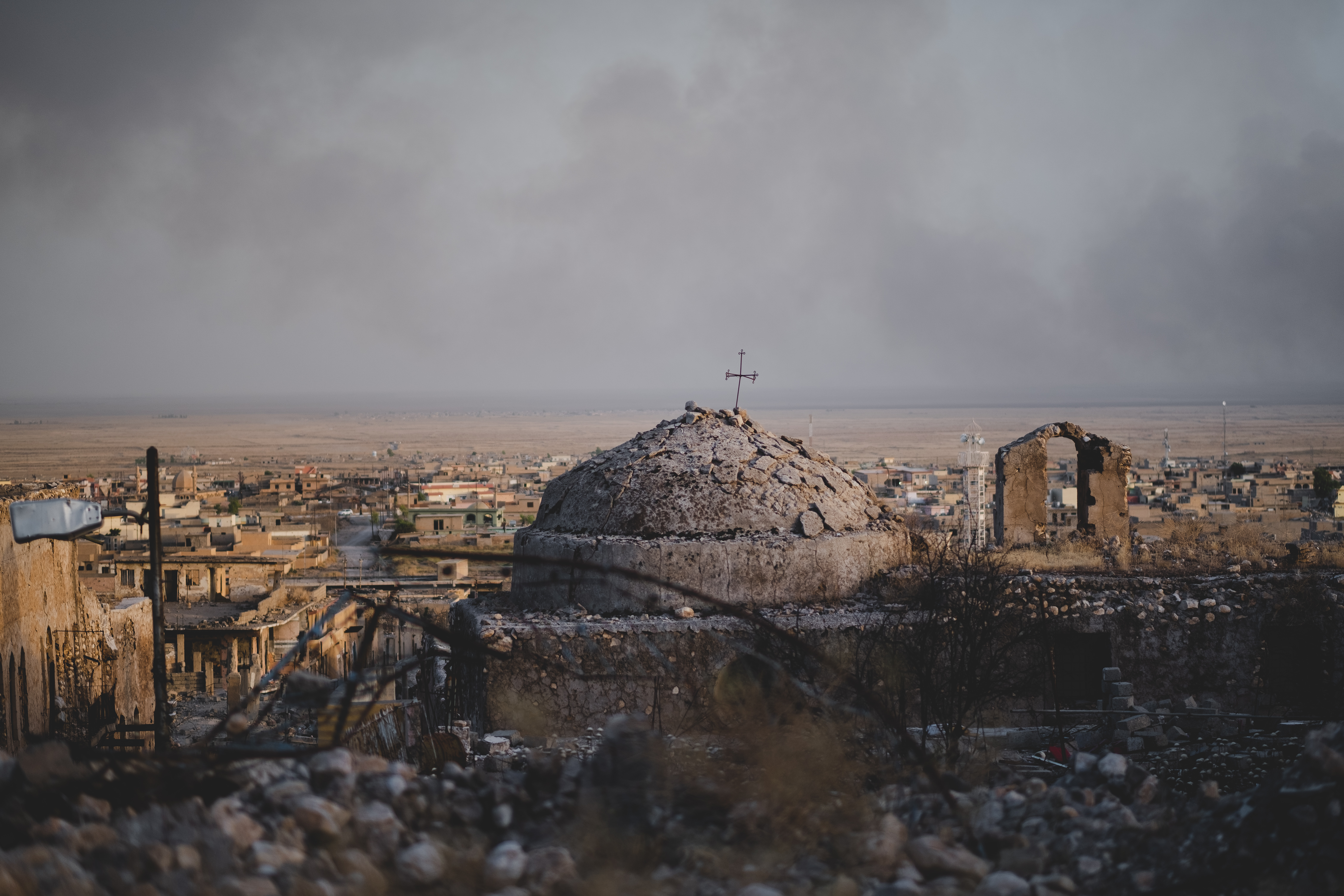
Cathedral rising above ruined buildings in the old neighborhood of Sinjar.

In 1974–1975, five neighborhoods in the city of Sinjar were Arabized during a campaign by the Iraqi government of President Saddam Hussein dubbed as a "modernization drive"; the neighborhoods were Bar Barozh, Saraeye, Kalhey, Burj and Barshey, whose inhabitants were relocated to the new towns or elsewhere in Iraq and replaced by Arabs. The majority of the Arabs resettled in the Sinjar Mountains have remained in the region as of 2010.

On 13 August 2009, a suicide bombing killed 21 people and wounded 32 in a cafe in the Kalaa neighborhood of Sinjar. On 14 August 2007, a series of truck bombings by al-Qaeda in Iraq in the towns of Qahtaniya and al-Jazira, both in the Sinjar District, killed 792 Yazidis.

According to statistical survey of the Sinjar District in 2013, the city of Sinjar had a population of 77,926. The ethnic composition of the city consisted of Kurds, Arabs, Turkmens, and Assyrians and the religious composition consisted of Yazidis, Sunni Muslims, and Christians. There were 23 primary schools, three intermediate schools and seven secondary schools, a hospital, two other health care facilities, three public parks and two sports fields. The town had three churches, a Syriac Orthodox Church, Syriac Catholic Church, and Armenian Apostolic Church, all of which were destroyed by the Islamic State of Iraq and the Levant.

=== Northern Iraq Offensive (2014) ===
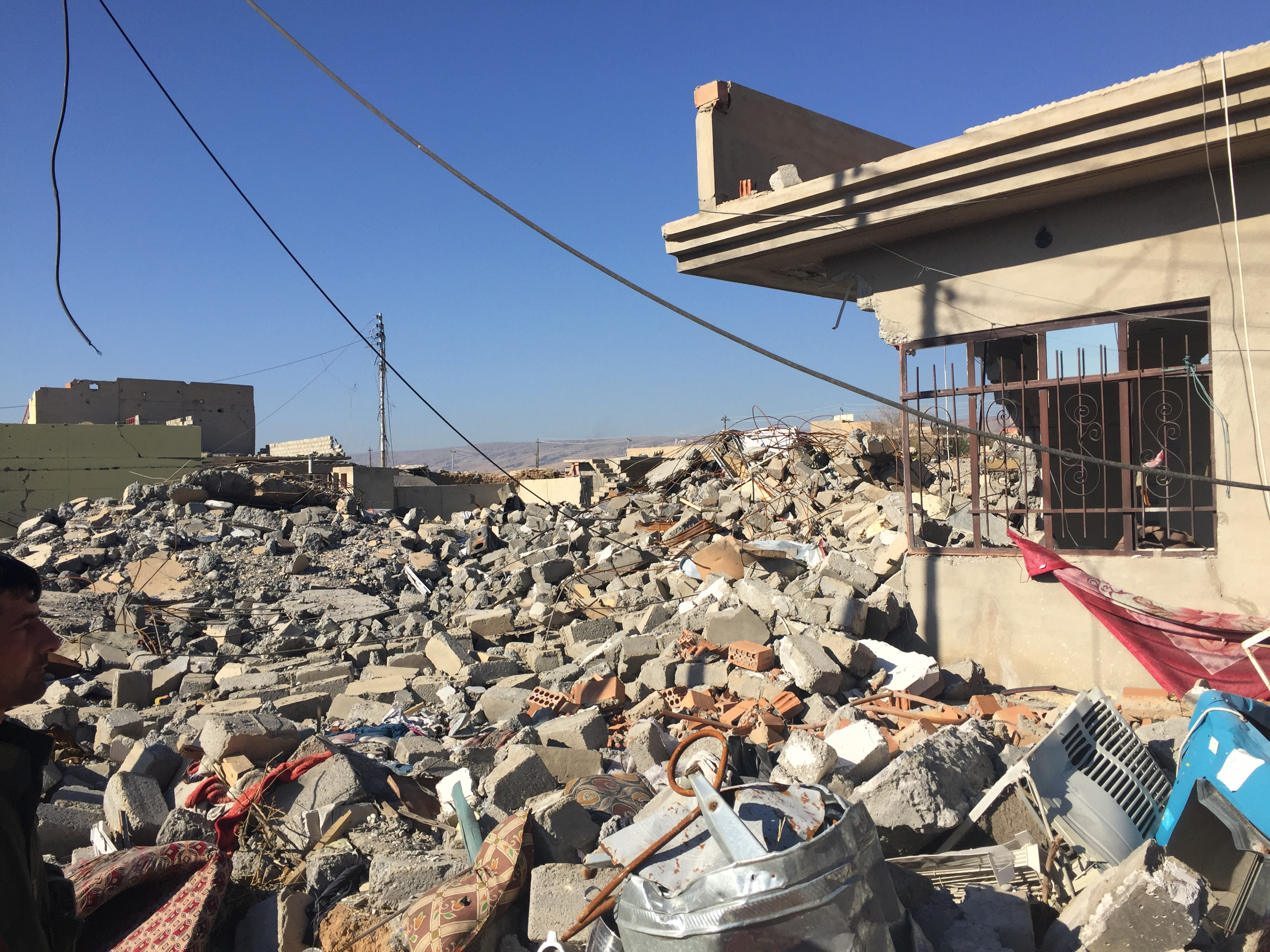
Sinjar after the reconquest of the so-called "Islamic State", December 2015

In the course of their second Northern Iraq offensive in August 2014, the Islamic State of Iraq and the Levant (ISIL) took over large areas of Nineveh province. Following the withdrawal of the Kurdish Peshmerga they captured the city of Sinjar on 3 August. During the following days, IS militants perpetrated the Sinjar massacre, killing 2,000 Yazidi men and taking Yazidi women into slavery, leading to a mass exodus of Yazidi residents. According to a United Nations report, 5,000 Yazidi civilians were killed during ISIL's August offensive. It is also known as the genocide of Yazidis by ISIL. The genocide was enabled partly as a result of the Peshmerga flight from the ISIL offensive, which left the Yazidis defenseless.

On the night of 20 December 2014, in the course of a first offensive to retake Sinjar from ISIL militants, Kurdish forces pushed into the city. However, the Kurdish advance into Sinjar was stalled, as they faced stiff resistance from ISIL militants inside the southern half of the city.

On 13 November 2015, a day after launching a major second offensive, Kurdish forces and Yazidi militias backed by US airstrikes, entered the city and fully regained its control from ISIL. Following the recapture, in the nearby hamlet of Solagh, east of Sinjar city, Kurdish forces found a mass grave with the remains of at least 78 Yazidi women from Kocho village believed to be executed by ISIL militants. Following the recapture of Sinjar, Yazidi groups engaged in revenge looting and burnings targeting Sunni Muslims, as well as reprisal killings.

=== Declaration of autonomy ===
In August 2017, the Yazidis of Sinjar declared their government autonomous at a press conference. Peshmerga forces withdrew from Sinjar on 17 October 2017, allowing the Iraqi Army and the Popular Mobilisation Units (PMU) to enter the town. The control of the town was handed over to the PMU-backed Yazidi group called "Lalesh Brigades" after Peshmerga's withdrawal.

In June 2020, the United States Commission on International Religious Freedom accused Turkey that during the Operations Claw-Eagle and Claw-Tiger, Turkey threatened Yazidi families who attempted to return to their homes in the town. Turkey rejected the claims.

In 2021 the Iraqi government called for the local Yazidi protection forces (who had fought ISIS), in Sinjar to withdraw, which was rejected by the Yazidi administration. This has led to international calls for the Iraqi army to de-escalate and withdraw from the region.

== Notable people ==
- Ahmad Sanjar, Sultan of the Seljuk Empire
- Nadia Murad, Yazidi human rights activist
- Haydar Shesho, Yazidi military commander

== See also ==
- Index of articles related to the Yezidis
- Disputed territories of Northern Iraq
- Yazidi genocide
- Military intervention against ISIL
- American-led intervention in Iraq (2014–present)
- List of Yazidi holy places
- List of Yazidi settlements
- Assyrians in Iraq
- Yazidis in Iraq

== Bibliography ==
- Alexander, Paul J. (1985). The Byzantine Apocalyptic Tradition. University of California Press. pp. 27. ISBN 0520049985.
- Haase, C. P. (1997). "Sindjar". In Bosworth, C. E.; van Donzel, E.; Heinrichs, W. P. & Lecomte, G. (eds.). The Encyclopaedia of Islam, Second Edition. Volume IX: San–Sze. Leiden: E. J. Brill. pp. 643–644. ISBN 978-90-04-10422-8.
- Savelzberg, Eva; Hajo, Siamend; Dulz, Irene (July–December 2010). "Effectively Urbanized: Yezidis in the Collective Towns of Sheikhan and Sinjar". Études rurales (186): 101–116. doi:10.4000/etudesrurales.9253. JSTOR 41403604.
