= Heliodora, Minas Gerais =

Brazilian municipality

Coordinates: 22°04′S 45°32′W

- Municipality
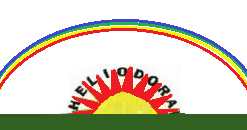
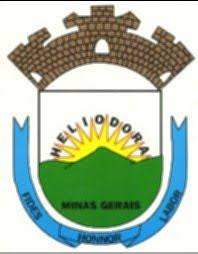
- Flag Coat of arms
- Interactive map of Heliodora, Minas Gerais
- Country: Brazil
- State: Minas Gerais
- Region: Southeast
- Time zone: UTC−3 (BRT)

Location of Heliodora

Heliodora is a municipality in the state of Minas Gerais in the Southeast region of Brazil. As of 2020, the estimated population was 6,591.

== Geography ==
The city of Heliodora is located in the southern region of the state of Minas Gerais, having a privileged position, as it is close to the cities of Lambari, São Lourenço, Caxambu, Cambuquira, Pouso Alegre and Varginha and is a strategic location because it is located near the Fernão Dias Highway (BR-381), which connects São Paulo to Belo Horizonte.

== See also ==
- List of municipalities in Minas Gerais
