= Banu Ash'ar =

Banu Ash'ar بنو الأشعر
- Qahtanite Arab
- Banner of Banu Ash'ar
- Ethnicity: Arab
- Nisba: Al-Ash'ari الأشعري
- Location: Yemen, Palestine
- Descended from: Nabat ibn Udad
- Religion: Paganism, later Islam

Banu al-Ash'ar (Arabic: رمز بنو ألاشعر-619-بن كهلان; Ancient South Arabian:, ʾs²ʿrn) also known as al-Ashaira (Arabic: الأشاعرة) is a Qahtanite tribe that inhabited Yemen in the Arabian Peninsula. The companion of the prophet, Abu Musa al-Ash'ari is a member of this tribe.

== History and origins ==
The progenitor of Banu al-Ash'ar is Nabat ibn Udad who is also known as al-Ash'ar. The tribe's lineage is as follows: Nabat ibn Udad ibn Zayd ibn Yashjub ibn Arib ibn Zayd ibn Kahlan ibn Saba' ibn Yashjub ibn Ya'rub ibn Qahtan.

Nabat ibn Udad (Ash'ar) had seven sons: Al-Jamahir, al-Atgham, al-Argham, al-Adgham, Jedda, Abd Shams and Abd al-Thurayya.

Banu al-Ash'ar tribe was originally from Zabid in Yemen. After the Islamic Conquests under the Rashidun Caliphate (631-661), Many members of the Banu al-Ash'ar moved to settle in Bilad al-Sham. According to Ya'qubi who is writing in 892, the Banu Ash'ar were the majority around Tiberias. Records show that they were among the Arab tribes which settled in al-Andalus. The majority settled in the district of Rayya in Malaga, while some of them were also to be found in the city of Seville.

== See also ==
- Arabian tribes that interacted with Muhammad
- Al-Asha'ir Mosque
- Tribes of Arabia
