= Ibn Abi Ramtha al-Tamimi =

Ibn Abi Ramtha al-Tamimi (Arabic: ابن أبي رمثة التميمي), from Banu Tamim tribe, was a physician who lived during the lifetime of the Islamic prophet Muhammad. He was a skilful practitioner who occasionally practised surgery.
