= Al-Dith ibn Adnan =

Akk ibn Adnan
- Known for: Founder of a Southern arabian tribe in Jordan.
- Spouse: A woman from the Asharites (descendant of Qahtan)
- Children: Akk ibn al-Dith (father of Al-Shahid ibn Akk and Sawda bint Akk)
- Parent(s): Adnan; Mahdad bint Laham (Banu Yaqshan)
- Relatives: Ma'ad ibn Adnan (brother)

Al-Dith ibn Adnan (Arabic: عك بن عدنان; perhaps the same as Akk) is the brother of Ma'add ibn Adnan, who is an ancestor of the Islamic prophet Muhammad. He is featured in ancient Arabic literature.

== Parentage ==
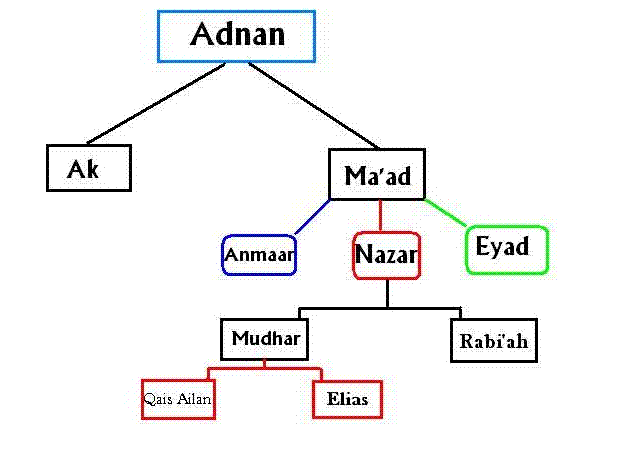
The Adnanite Arab family tree, created from "The Life of Mohammad" by Ibn Hisham

Some say that Ma'add ibn Adnan had a brother called Al-Dith, and that he was actually Akk. However, others say that Akk was the son of Al-Dith, and thus a grandson of Adnan. Nevertheless, the majority agree that Akk and Al-Dith are the same person, the son of Adnan.

If Akk and Al-Dith are the same person, then his mother and the mother of Ma'add ibn Adnan were the same.

== Tribe ==
Akk dwelt in the Yaman because he took a wife amongst the Asharites and lived with them, adopting their language. The Asharites were descended from Saba' ibn Yashjub ibn Ya'rub ibn Qahtan.

Akk was the founder of a Southern Arabian tribe, the tribe of Akk. According to the following verse, the mother of Madhij (the founder of another Southern tribe that settled in Jordan) was from Akk:

Woe to the mother of Madhij from Akk!

(That is the mother of Madhij weeping)

Some genealogists say that Akk departed for Samran, in the Yemen, leaving his brother Ma'add. This is because, when the people of Hadur killed Shu'ayb b. Dhi Mahdam al- Haduri, God sent Nebuchadnezzar II against them as a punishment. Armiya and Barkhiya went away taking Ma'add with them, and when the warfare had died down they took him back to Mecca. Ma'add then found that his brothers and uncles who were descended from Adnan had joined the peoples of the Yemen and had intermarried with them; the Yemenites had been sympathetic to them because they were descendants of Jurhum. They quote the following verse as proof of this story:

We left our brothers, al-Dith and Akk
on their way to Samran, and they departed quickly.
They were of the Banu Adnan,

but they lost this descent irrevocably among themselves.

== See also ==
- Qahtan
- Adnan
- Ahl al-Bayt
- Family tree of Muhammad
- Family tree of Shaiba ibn Hashim
- Banu Hashim
- Banu Quraysh
- Banu Kinanah
- Banu Mudhar
