= Ibn al-Akfani =

Arab encyclopedist and physician

Muhammad ibn Ibrāhīm ibn al-Akfani (Arabic: ابن الأكفاني, 1286-ca. 1348–49) was a Kurdish Cairene encyclopedist and physician.

== Life ==
Ibn al-Akfani was born in Sinjar and lived in Cairo, the capital of Mamluk Egypt. He worked at Al-Mansuri Hospital during a time when the Black Death swept across Egypt with Cairo reporting around 20,000 deaths per day. He died in either 1348 or 1349 of the bubonic plague.

== Work ==
He wrote at least 22 books. Most of his books were science related, including logic, gemology, mathematics, medicine and astronomy. Specific subjects include bloodletting, slavery and ophthalmology.

His most famous work was a science encyclopedia called Iršād al-qāsid ilā asnā' al-maqāsid. The encyclopedia examines 60 subjects with bibliographies and a glossary of terms. His book, Kitāb nuhab al-dahā'ir fī ahwāl al-jawāhir, is about gemstones, with a focus about jacinth.
