= Zuhri =

Moroccan folklore creature

A zuhri or zouhri (Moroccan Arabic: زوهري, romanized: zūhrī) in North African folklore is a human-djinn hybrid child. Its feminine form is zuhriyya (Moroccan Arabic: زوهرية). According to some beliefs, zuhris possess physical and supernatural traits that distinguish them from normal children, and make their blood valuable and sought after for various magical rituals, especially the hunt for old treasures, believed to be hidden or protected by the djinn.

While such superstitions have mostly disappeared in Morocco, or are not taken as seriously as in the past, several instances of violence, kidnapping and even murder of children in Morocco, may be related to attempts at finding hidden treasures using "zuhri" children. They may be subject to kidnapping by human traffickers, to be resold at a hefty price to treasure hunters. In Algeria, media outlets report similar cases of kidnapping and murder of "zuhri" children.

== Etymology ==
The term "zuhri" may find its origin in the Moroccan Arabic word زهر (zher) meaning "luck", or it may have derived from "Zohar", the name of a book of Kabbalah.

== Traits and origin of a Zuhri ==
Children believed to be zuhri can have some or all of these physical traits:

- The Zouhri line: one or both hands having a horizontal line crossing the entire palm of the hand (single transverse palmar crease) instead of two. In beliefs like palmistry, these two lines are called the head line and the heart line. When these two lines meet to form a single line, it is called the single transverse palmar crease, formerly known as the "simian line" (a term which fell out of favor because of the pejorative connotation). This line is called both the heart line and the head line. According to palmistry, these individuals are endowed with exceptional intelligence and a great capacity for love or a great capacity for contempt. They think with the heart and the head equally.
- A stain at the bottom of the iris.
- Heterochromia (two eyes of different colors).
- A vertical line crossing the tongue. Only one of these characteristics is enough to define an individual of Zouhri.
- A distinctive line or mark on the tongue
- Blond or red hair
- Blue or green eyes, displaying some dissymmetry
- A distinctive mark on the hair or the iris

A zuhri is believed to be either a djinn offspring who was swapped with a human newborn at birth, or a human child who has supernatural abilities, possibly due to being possessed by a djinn from birth.

== Rituals ==
According to Ahmed Amlik, professor of History at Cadi Ayyad University of Marrakech, people in the past tended to bury their personal or family valuables at hidden locations in forests, or in deep wells, usually during times of turmoil and civil war. Zuhri children are thought to possess psychic abilities or connection to the world of djinns, that can help with finding the hidden treasures buried at those locations, and are therefore used like "magical treasure detectors". The ritual of finding the treasure may involve the recitation of Koranic verses, as well as spilling the blood of the zuhri child. The zuhri may also help with carrying the treasure, since he or she is believed to be less likely to be punished by the djinns for stealing their possession. The ritual may end by sacrificing the child and spilling their blood on the treasure, to appease the anger of the djins. In some cases the child is simply abandoned between life and death.

== In fiction ==
- Road To Limbo (French: Le Chemin des Suspendus, Moroccan Arabic: طريق لخلوة) is a 2022 French-Moroccan movie produced by Marie Gutmann, written by Ayoub Lahnoud, about Taher, a Zouhri child who gets rescued by a man named Rahal, and their adventure together.
