= Ishaq ibn Hunayn =

9th-century Arab scholar, son of Hunayn Ibn Ishaq

Ishaq Ibn Hunayn
- Born: 830; Baghdad, Abbasid Caliphate, now Iraq
- Died: 910 (aged 80); Baghdad, Abbasid Caliphate, now Iraq
- Occupations: Mathematician, Translator
- Writing career
- Years active: 850– 910
- Notable works: Translation of Euclid's Elements, Translation of Ptolemy's Almagest

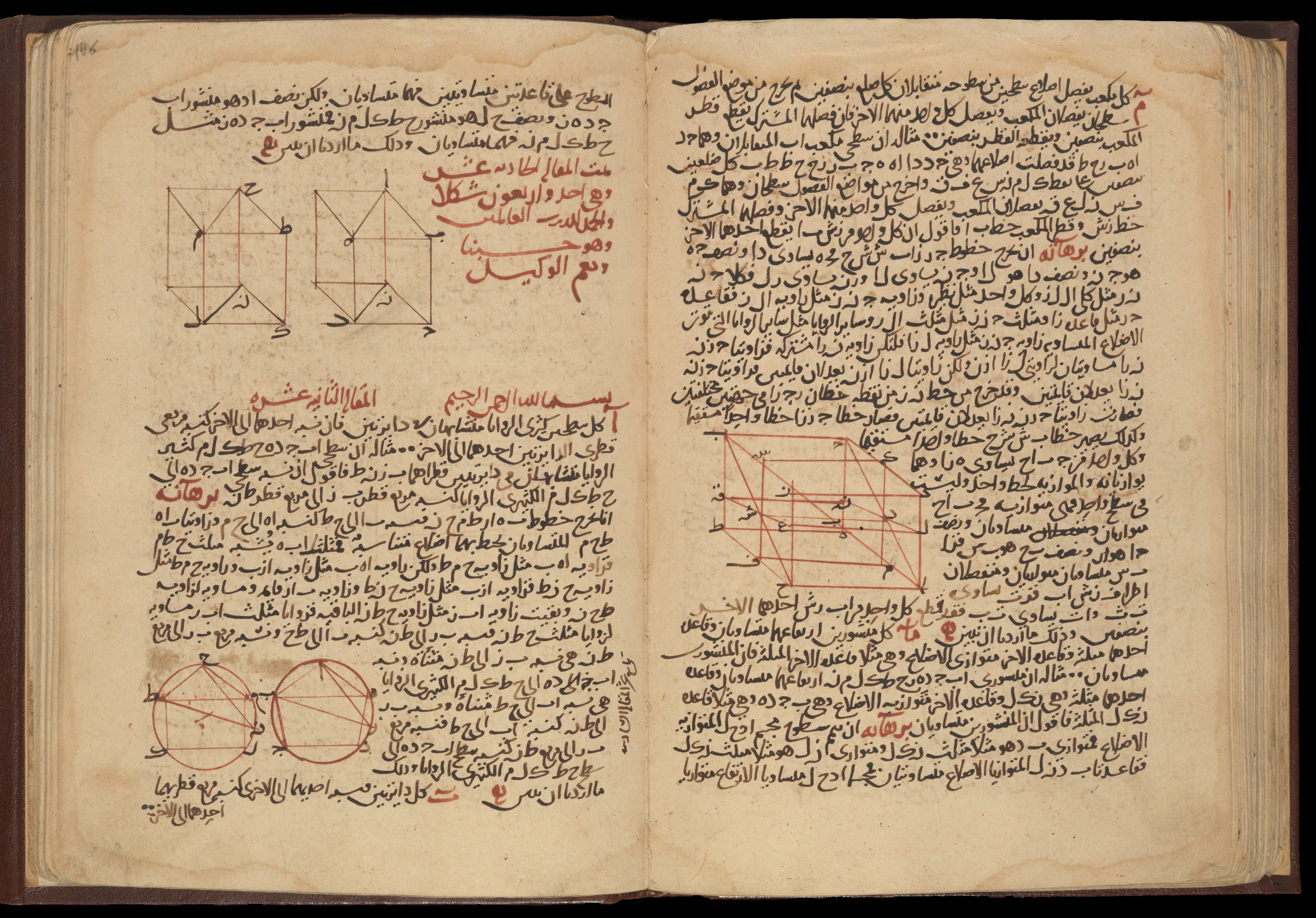
Double-page from the Ishaq ibn Hunayn's Arabic Translation of Euclid's Elements. Iraq, 1270. Chester Beatty Library

Abū Yaʿqūb Isḥāq ibn Ḥunayn (Arabic: إسحاق بن حنين) (c. 830 Baghdad, – c. 910-1) was an influential Arab physician and translator, known for writing the first biography of physicians in the Arabic language. He is also known for his translations of Euclid's Elements and Ptolemy's Almagest. He is the son of the famous translator Hunayn Ibn Ishaq.

== See also ==
- Hunayn ibn Ishaq, his father.
- List of Muslim scientists and scholars
