= Lists of Muslim scientists and scholars =

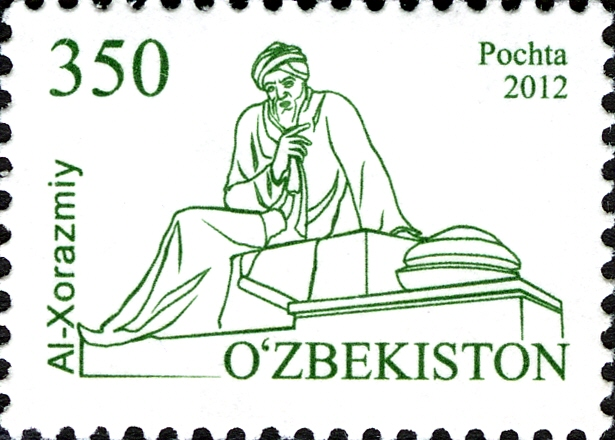
Uzbek stamp honoring Muhammad Khwarizmi

Lists of Muslim scientists and scholars cover scientists and scholars who were active in the Islamic world before the modern era. They include:

- List of scientists in medieval Islamic world
- List of pre-modern Arab scientists and scholars
- List of pre-modern Iranian scientists and scholars
