= Heliodorus of Athens =

Athenian historian (2nd century BCE)

Heliodorus of Athens (Greek: Ἡλιόδωρος), also known as Heliodorus Periegeta (Greek: Περιηγητής), was an ancient Greek writer and historian known for authoring a fifteen-book work on the antiquities of the Acropolis of Athens, around 150 BCE.

Heliodorus was most likely was from Attica, and likely lived after the rule of Antiochus IV Epiphanes
