= Heliodorus (surgeon) =

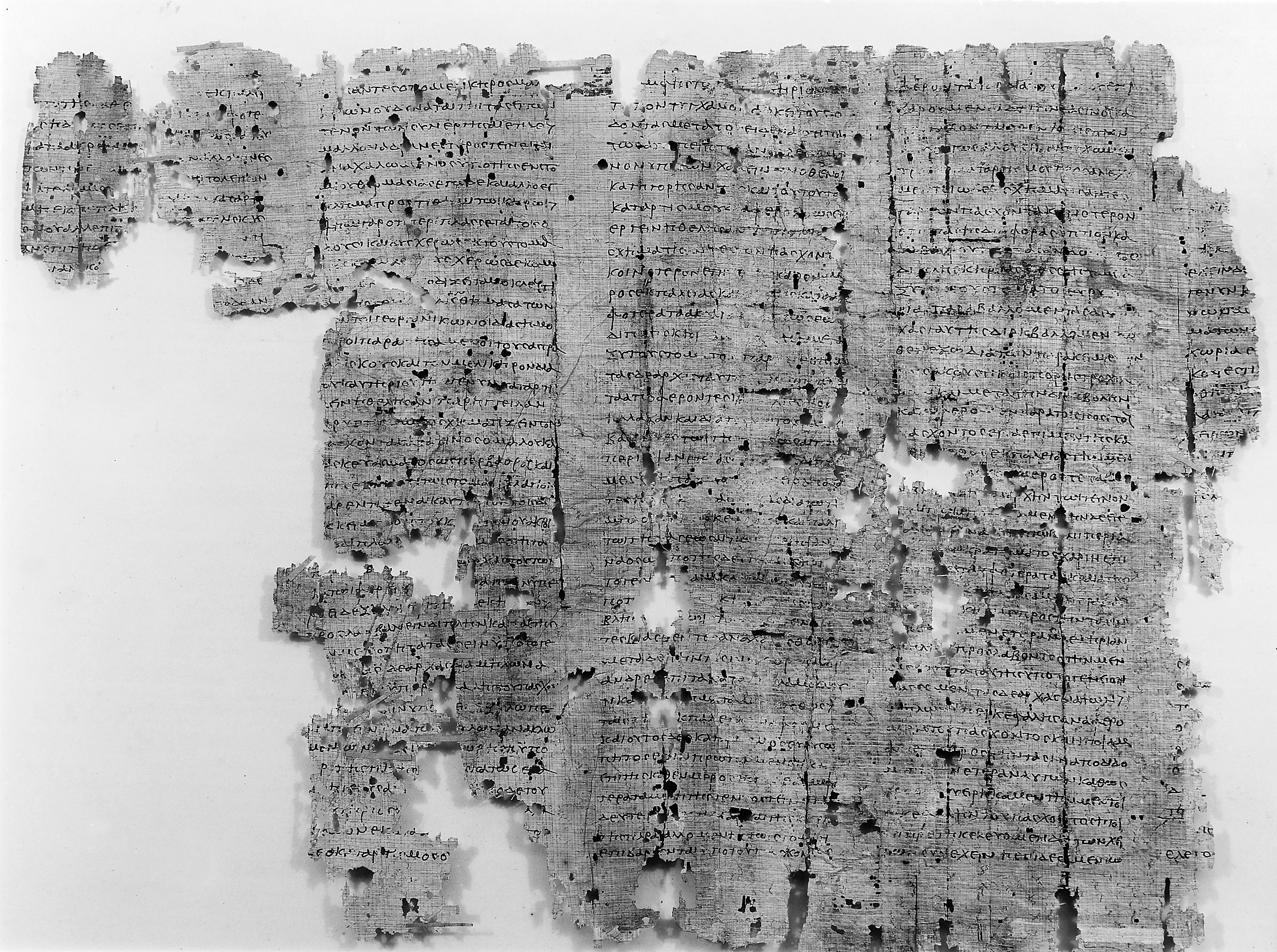
Commentary on Luxation attributed to Heliodorus

Heliodorus (Greek: Ἡλιόδωρος) was a surgeon of the pneumatic school in the 1st century AD. He was probably from Egypt, and was mentioned in the Satires of Juvenal. Heliodorus wrote several books on medical technique which have survived in fragments and in the works of Oreibasius.
