= Abū Jaʿfar al-Ghāfiqī =

Andalusian (Spain) Arab botanist, pharmacologist, physician, and scholar

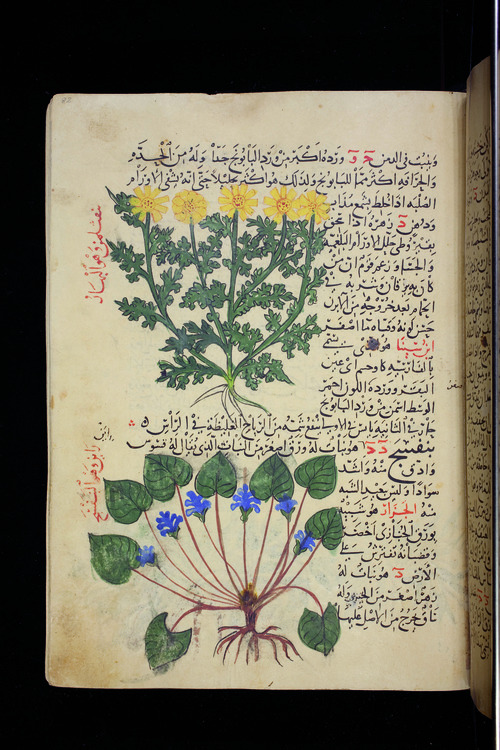

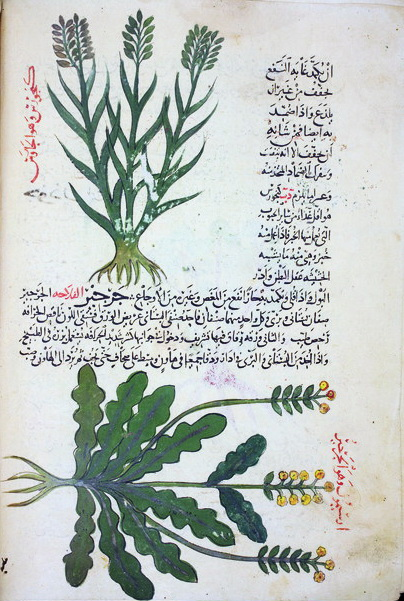

Abū Jaʿfar al-Ghāfiqī was an 11th-century Andalusi Arab botanist, pharmacologist, physician and scholar from Ghafiq near Córdoba in southern Iberia.

Al-Ghāfiqī's birth and death dates are uncertain. In modern literature, he is commonly mistakenly identified with Muhammad ibn Aslam al-Ghafiqi a 12th-century scholar who died around 1165. Nonetheless, the oldest copy of his only known work is dated 1111, implying that he lived at least part of his life in the 11th century. He also been erroneously identified as the younger al-Ghafiqi's son. He was responsible for the collating and creating of 'Kitāb fī l-adwiya al-mufrada' (“Book of simple drugs”), a remarkable compendium of some 400 hand-drawn and coloured images of plants and animals, popularly known as the “Herbal of al-Ghafiqi". The Herbal draws on ancient Greek sources like Dioscorides and Galen and more than thirty other works from India and the Hellenistic and Islamic worlds.

Sir William Osler purchased a manuscript copy of the Herbal in 1912 and it was chosen for reproduction in a modern edition by McGill University - it deals with herbal, mineral, and animal-derived drugs. The edition has a glossary of over 2 000 entries providing synonyms in Greek, Sanskrit, Syriac, Persian, Berber, Old Spanish, Latin, Coptic, and Armenian, underlining the international nature of medicine and pharmacy at the time of its compilation. Herbal and botanical gardens, generally, have always been greatly prized in the Arab world, and the gardens of al-Andalus were no exception, giving Abū Jaʿfar al-Ghāfiqī ample access to specimens for describing and illustrating. The exiled Umayyad Prince Abd al-Rahman I created an opulent garden in his palace Al-Munyat al-Rusafa (Arruzafa) in 756 and it was destroyed in 1010 by the Berbers. The garden had been to remind him of his former palace at Al-Rusafa, Syria where he had lived with his grandfather, the caliph Hisham (691–743).

== See also ==
- Medicine in the medieval Islamic world
