= Muhammad ibn Aslam al-Ghafiqi =

12th-century Andalusian ophthalmologist

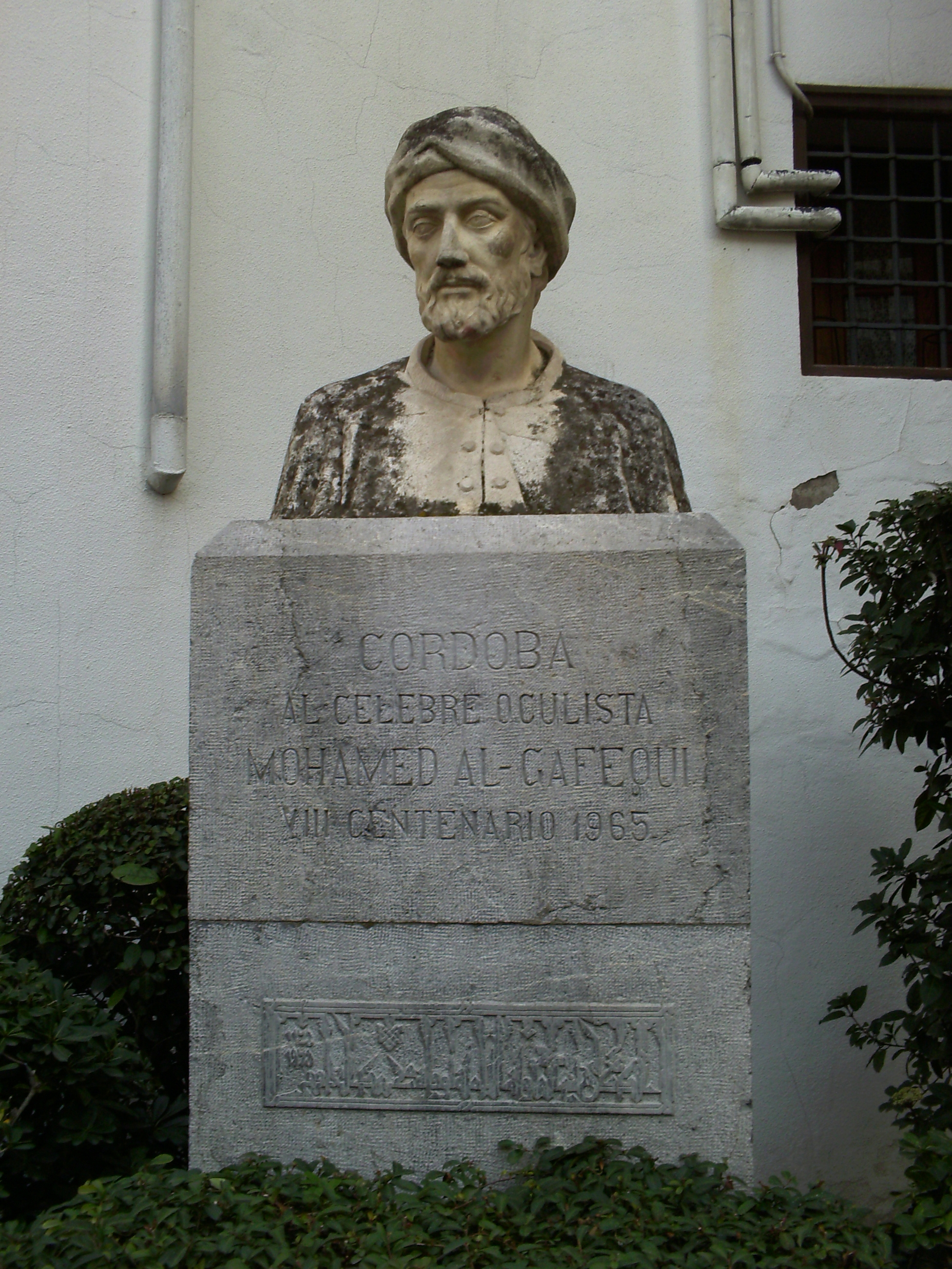
Statue of Al-Ghafiqi in Córdoba

Muhammad ibn Aslam al-Ghāfiqī (Arabic: محمد بن أسلم الغافقي) (died 1165) was an Andalusian Arab oculist and author of The Right Guide to Ophthalmology (Kitāb al-Murshid fi’ l-kuḥl).

== Work ==
The Right Guide to Ophthalmology shows that the physicians of the time had a complex understanding of the conditions of the eye and eyelids, which they treated with many different surgical procedures, ointments, and chemical medicines.
