= Al-Andalusi =

Al-Andalusi (Arabic: الأندلسي; alternatively Al Andalusi, Al Andalousi, El-Andaloussi, El Andaloussi, Landoulsi or Landolsi) is an Arabic-language surname common in North African countries (mainly Morocco, Algeria and Tunisia) that literally means “the Andalusi/Andalusian”, and it denotes an origin or ancestry from al-Andalus (Arabic name of the Iberian Peninsula) or from the modern-day region of Andalusia. Andalusian culture was heavily influenced by Syrian Arab culture, and most Arab tribes present in al-Andalus had a Syrian or Yemeni origin. Al-Andalusi may refer to:

- Ibn Arabi
- Maimonides, Andalusian Sephardic Jewish rabbi and philosopher whose Arabic name was Abu ‘Imran Musa ibn Maymun ibn 'Ubaydallah al-Qurṭubi al-Andalusi al-‘Isra'ili from Córdoba
- Avempace
- Ibn Rushd, more often latinized as Averroes
- Ibn Tufayl al-Qaysi al-Andalusi, Andalusian Muslim polymath
- Abu as-Salt al-Andalusi, known in Latin as Albuzale, was an Andalusian Arab polymath who wrote about pharmacology, geometry, Aristotelian physics, and astronomy
- Ibn Zuhr, traditionally known by his Latinized name Avenzoar
- Ibn Khaldun
- Al-Qurtubi
- Abu Hayyan al-Andalusi
- Ibn al-Baraq al-Andalusi
- Abu Madyan al-Andalusi, Andalusian Arab mystic, great Sufi master and the teacher of Ibn Arabi
- Ja'far ibn Ali ibn Hamdun al-Andalusi, Fatimid governor of M'Sila
- Ibn Hazm al-Andalusi
- Ibn Saʿīd al-Maghribī, also known as Ibn Saʿīd al-Andalusī, 12th-13th century Arab geographer, historian and poet from al-Andalus
- Muhammad ibn Hani al-Andalusi al-Azdi, usually called Ibn Hani, was an Andalusian Isma'īlī Shī'ī poet and the chief court poet to the Fatimid Caliph al-Mu'izz
- Ibn 'Abd al-Barr al-Namari al-Andalusi
- Ibn al-Faradi
- Ibn al-Baytar
- Ibn Hayyan al-Andalusi
- Ibn Juzayy
- Abu Hafs Umar al-Iqritishi
- Ibn 'Atiyya
- Al-Ghazal
- Al-Sahili
- Ibn al-Raqqam al-Andalusi
- Ibn as-Saffar al-Andalusi
- Ṣāʿid al-Andalusī
- Abu al-Walid al-Baji
- Ibn Lubbal al-Sharishi (full name Abu al-Hasan Ali ibn Ahmad ibn Ali ibn Lubbal al-Qurashi al-Andalusi), was an Andalusian Muslim scholar and Poet from Jerez de la Frontera (Arabic: شريش)
- Ibn al-Zaqqaq, sometimes wrongly called al-Mursi (fl. 12th century), Andalusi poet
- Ibn Arfa’ Ra’s, whose fuller name was Burhān al-Dīn Abū al-Ḥasan ʿAlī ibn Mūsa ibn Abī al-Qāsim al-Anṣārī al-Andalusī
- Yaʿīsh ibn Ibrāhīm al-Andalusī al-Umawī
- Abu al-Majd ibn Abi al-Hakam, Andalusian Arab physician, musician and astrologer of the Islamic Golden Age who lived in Damascus, Syria
- Abu ʾl-Khayr al-Ishbīlī (fl. 11th century), agronomist
- Muhyi al-Din al-Maghribi al-Andalusi, Andalusian astronomer, astrologer and mathematician of the Islamic Golden Age
- Recemundus (Arabic: Rabi ibn Sid al-Usquf or Rabi ibn Zaid, Castilian: Recemundo) was the Mozarabic bishop of Elvira and secretary of the caliph of Córdoba in the mid-10th century
- Muhammad al-Idrisi, Muslim geographer and cartographer
- Abu Bakr ibn al-Arabi, Muslim judge and scholar of Maliki law from al-Andalus
- al-Ishbili Abu Muhammad Jabir ibn Aflah (1100–1150), Muslim astronomer and mathematician
- Abu Zakariya al-Ishbili, called Ibn al-'Awwam (fl. late 12th century), Muslim agriculturalist
- Abū Isḥāq al-Biṭrūjī al-Ishbīlī (died c. 1204), Muslim astronomer and judge
- Ibn al-Ha'im al-Ishbili (fl. c. 1213), Muslim astronomer and mathematician
- Abou Haggag Youssef ibn Mohammed el-Balawi el-Andaloussi, 12th-13th Century Andalusian Islamic scholar and linguist who made a detailed description of the Lighthouse of Alexandria in 1166 when he visited the city on his way to make Hajj (pilgrimage)
- Ali Ben Ibrahim Al Andaloussi (d. 1654), Moroccan doctor and teacher of medicine during the Saadian period
- Hadj Moussa Jamiro al-Andaloussi al-Garnati, architect of the Borj el Wistani fort at Ghar El Melh
- Abu 'Imran Musa Musa ibn Ṭubi al-Ishbili (fl. 14th century), Jewish Arabic poet
- Abbad Jawad El Andaloussi
- Mohammad Abbad El Andaloussi
- Ahmed Landolsi, Tunisian actor
- Nouha Landoulsi, Tunisian weightlifter

== See also ==
- Andalusi (disambiguation)
- Andalusia (disambiguation)
- Andalusian (disambiguation)
