= Al-Ishbili =

al-Ishbili (Arabic, 'from Seville') is a surname. Notable people with the surname include:

- Abu'l-Khayr al-Ishbili, 11th century Andalusi agronomist
- Jabir ibn Aflah al-Ishbili (1100–1150), Muslim astronomer and mathematician
- Ibn al-'Awwam (Abu Zakariya Yahya ibn Muhammad ibn Ahmad ibn Al-'Awwam Al-Ishbili, fl. late 12th century), Muslim agriculturalist
- Nur ad-Din al-Bitruji al-Ishbīlī (died c. 1204), Muslim astronomer and judge
- Ibn al-Ha'im al-Ishbili (fl. c. 1213), Muslim astronomer and mathematician
- Musa ibn Tubi (Ibn ʿUmran Musa ibn Tubi al-Israʿili Ishbili, fl. 14th century), Jewish Arabic poet
