= Ibn Ishaq al-Tunisi =

13th century Tunisian astronomer and author

Abū al‐ʿAbbās ibn Isḥāq al‐Tamīmī al‐Tūnisī (Arabic: ابن اسحاق التونسي), known as Benesac to contemporary Europeans, was a 13th-century Tunisian astronomer and the author of an important zij which inaugurated a new astronomical tradition in the Maghreb for centuries to come.

Almost nothing is known about Ibn Isḥaq's life. Besides his unfinished zij, the only information about him comes from the North African scholars Ibn Khaldūn and Ibn al-Banna', which shows him being active in Marrakesh besides his native Tunisia. It could be deduced from his name that he belonged to the Banu Tamim tribe.

Ibn Isḥaq's astronomical tables have only survived in a newly discovered manuscript edited by a later author. The anonymous author seems to have completed the work by adding canons for the tables. The work was partly based on original observations made by Ibn Isḥaq himself and by a contemporary Jewish astronomer from Sicily, while on the other part it was based on Andalusian sources including the works of al-Zarqali, al-Jayyani and others.

Ibn Isḥaq's tables were available at the University of Paris before the end of the 13th century. They are cited by John of Sicily (c. 1292) and Alard of Diest (1307).

== See also ==
- Islamic astronomy
- Ibn al‐Raqqam
