= Ibn al-Kammad =

Al-Andalus Muslim astronomer (died 1195)

Abu Jafar Ahmad ibn Yusuf ibn al-Kammad (Arabic: أبو جعفر أحمد بن يوسف بن الكماد) (died 1195) was a Muslim Arab astronomer born in Seville, Al-Andalus. He is known to have been educated in Cordoba by the students of Al-Zarqali. His works such as al Kawr ala al dawr, al Amad ala al abad, and al Muqtabas, which is a compilation of the two previous Zij, made him famous not only on the Iberian Peninsula but across the Maghreb, and specifically Tunisia, where the astronomer Ibn Ishaq al-Tunisi wrote commentaries on his works.

An astrological work, Kitāb Mafātīḥ alasrār, (in which he states the duration of pregnancy depended on the horoscope) is also attributed to him and was strongly criticized by Ibn al‐Haim al‐Ishbili in the latter's al Zīj al kāmil (c.1205).
