= Ibn al-Ha'im al-Ishbili =

13th-century Muslim astronomer, mathematician and author

Ibn al‐Hāʾim
- ابن الهائم
- Born: fl. c. 1213; Seville, Almohad Caliphate

Academic work
- Era: Islamic Golden Age
- Main interests: Mathematics, astronomy
- Notable works: al‐Zīj al‐kāmil fī al‐talim

Abu Muhammad Abd al-Haqq al‐Ghafiqi al‐Ishbili (Arabic: ابن الهائم), also known as Ibn al‐Hāʾim (fl. c. 1213 was a medieval Muslim astronomer and mathematician from Seville.

He is known to modern scholars for his al‐Zīj al‐kāmil fī al‐talim (1204/5), which had a great influence on the development of Islamic astronomy and which has provided important information on astronomers from Al-Andalus, including the instrument maker and astrologer Al-Zarqali.

== Life ==
Ibn al‐Hāʾim originated from Seville in Al-Andalus. As a student, he learnt mathematics using the works of the scholars Al-Jayyani and Jabir ibn Aflah. He probably worked in North Africa, at a time when the Almohad Caliphate ruled the region. Ibn al‐Hāʾim became proficient at mathematics and was familiar with the trigonometrical concepts introduced into al‐Andalus by the scholar Ibn Mu'adh al-Jayyani in the 11th century and developed during the next century by the astronomer and mathematician Jābir ibn Aflaḥ.

== al‐Zīj al‐kāmil fī al‐talim ==
In 1204/5 Ibn al‐Hāʾim wrote al‐Zīj al‐kāmil fī al‐talim ("The Perfect Handbook on Mathematical Astronomy"), a treatise that consisted of an introduction and seven books. A zīj in all but name, the information it contains does not include any numerical tables. It was considered exceptionally complete and accurate by Islamic medieval astronomers, and he had a great influence on the development of astronomy in the Maghreb.

The work has provided modern historians with important information on earlier astronomers in al‐Andalus. It gives historical data on the life and works of the instrument maker and astrologer Al-Zarqali and the creation of the Tables of Toledo by astronomers in Toledo patronized by the qadi Said Al-Andalusi.

Ibn al‐Hāʾim further extended Al-Zarqali's theories on the oscillation of the obliquity of the ecliptic, presented spherical trigonometrical formulae, gives a longitude of the solar apogee of 85° 49′ and further confirmed the works of Al-Zarqali. The work also deals with the computation of the Moon's longitude and latitude, attempting to correct Ptolemy's theory.

A copy of the manuscript is held at the Bodleian Library at Oxford, UK.

== Sources ==
- Puig, Roser (2007). "Ibn al‐Hāʾim: Abū Muḥammad ʿAbd al‐Ḥaqq al‐Ghāfiqī al‐Ishbīlī". In Thomas Hockey; et al. (eds.). The Biographical Encyclopedia of Astronomers. New York: Springer Publishers. ISBN 978-0-387-31022-0. (PDF version)
- Samsó, Julio (1997). "Ibn al‐Hāʾim". In Helaine Selin (ed.). Encyclopaedia of the History of Science, Technology, and Medicine in Non-Western Cultures. Kluwer Academic Publishers. ISBN 9780792340669.
