= Al-Sahili =

Andalusian-Malian poet (c. 1290–1346)

Shaykh Abu Ishaq al-Sahili

Personal life
- Born: c. 688–689 AH | c. 1290 CE Granada, Emirate of Granada
- Died: 747 AH | 15 October 1346 CE Timbuktu, Mali Empire
- Known for: His poetry and service at the court of Mansa Musa
- Other name: al-Tuwayjin (الطُّوَيجِن)
- Occupation: Andalusi poet, jurist and Islamic scholar

Religious life
- Religion: Islam
- Denomination: Sunni
- Jurisprudence: Maliki
- Creed: Ash'ari

Muslim leader
- Based in: Timbuktu

Abu Ishaq al-Sahili (Arabic: أبو إسحاق الساحلي, romanized: Abū Isḥāq al-Sāḥilī; c. 1290 – 15 October 1346), also known as al-Tuwayjin (Arabic: ـالطُّوَيجِن, romanized: al-Ṭuwayjin), was an Andalusi poet and fiqh scholar who became a favored member of the court of Mansa Musa, Emperor of Mali. He is the most renowned of the scholars from the wider Muslim world who emigrated to Mali in the aftermath of Mansa Musa's pilgrimage.

== Name ==
His full name was Abū Isḥāq Ibrāhīm ibn Muḥammad ibn Ibrāhīm al-Sāḥilī al-Anṣārī al-Gharnāṭī. His nisba al-Sahili was inherited from his maternal grandfather and indicates he lived on the coast. His nisba al-Anṣārī (alternatively given as al-Awsī) indicates he claimed descent from the Arab tribes who sheltered Muhammad in Medina, the Ansar, with the latter possibility specifically indicating he claimed descent from the two most powerful such tribes. He also was known by the sobriquet al-Tuwayjin, which translates as "the small casserole", but no explanation has been found for this name.

== Biography ==
=== Early life ===
Abu Ishaq al-Sahili was born in the Emirate of Granada during the late 13th century. (Note: Al-Sahili's date of birth is unknown, but he was already a well-known poet by the time of his departure from Grenada in c. 1321, implying he could not have been born much later than 1290.) His father, Muhammad, was trained in jurisprudence and was the head of the perfume guild of Granada.

In Granada, al-Sahili became a drafter of legal documents and did some work on legal problems. In this time, he became known as a poet and was described in laudatory terms by his contemporary Ibn al-Khatib.

A near-contemporary poet said that he once suffered from temporary madness while under the influence of a badly prepared marking nut and declared himself to be a prophet. For whatever reason, he left Granada in disgrace. In approximately 1321, he departed al-Andalus and traveled to Mamluke Egypt and Syria, Jalayirid Iraq, and Rasulid Yemen before going on Hajj in 1324.

=== Court of Mansa Musa ===
While on the hajj in 1324, al-Sahili met Mansa Musa, the ruler of Mali. Al-Sahili traveled back to Mali with Mansa Musa, who enjoyed his conversation and gave him gifts. Musa may have found his eloquence and knowledge of Islamic jurisprudence appealing. Musa brought many scholars back to Mali with him, of which al-Sahili became the most famous.

Al-Sahili directed the construction of an audience chamber in the capital of Mali, for which Musa paid him 12,000 mithqals (51 kg) of gold. Al-Sahili's contribution may have been largely managerial, and the payment may have included the construction budget. However, al-Sahili's calligraphic skills were well-regarded, and he may have had a personal hand in decorating the building. On some occasion, possibly as part of the payment for the audience chamber, Musa gave al-Sahili 4,000 mithqals in a single day.

After traveling to Mali, al-Sahili settled in Timbuktu. When the Alexandrian merchant Siraj al-Din traveled to Mali in 1334 to collect a debt owed by Mansa Musa, al-Sahili hosted him in his home. Siraj al-Din died while a guest of al-Sahili; foul play was initially suspected, but Siraj al-Din's son attested that his father died of natural causes. Al-Sahili may have encouraged positive relations between Mali and the Marinid Sultanate, and at some point between 1331 and 1337, al-Sahili traveled to the Maghreb and exchanged gifts with the Marinid sultan Abu al-Hasan. While in the Maghreb, al-Sahili considered returning to Grenada, but circumstances forced him to return to Mali. He was attacked by bandits en route, but eventually returned to Timbuktu.

Al-Sahili died on October 15, 1346, in Timbuktu, and was buried there. Though he probably never married, he was survived by several children, who settled in Walata. The traveler Ibn Battuta remarked on seeing his grave when he visited Timbuktu in 1353.

== Contribution to West African architecture ==
Many modern sources refer to al-Sahili as an architect and credit many architectural works of West Africa to him, including the Djinguereber Mosque and a royal palace in Timbuktu and the mosque of Gao. The French colonial official and scholar Maurice Delafosse regarded al-Sahili as the creator of Sudano-Sahelian architecture, which he regarded as having been based on Maghrebi architecture.

However, there is very little support for a role for al-Sahili in the architecture of Mali. The only project he is known to have been involved in was the audience chamber in the city of Mali, and his contribution to the project may have been more organizational than architectural. Other structures that have been attributed to him have been attributed to him largely on the assumption that he was Musa's chief architect, which is not supported by the sources. West African architecture primarily arose due to a combination of indigenous development and gradual influence from North Africa. The architectural historian Labelle Prussin has characterised the Sudano-Sahelian tradition more specifically as a centuries-long synthesis of indigenous West African and Islamic design practices, rather than an importation attributable to any single foreign architect.

== Bibliography ==
- Aradeon, Suzan B. (1989). "Al-Sahili: the historian's myth of architectural technology transfer from North Africa". Journal des africanistes. 59 (1): 99–131. doi:10.3406/jafr.1989.2279. ISSN 0399-0346.
- Bloom, Jonathan M. (2008). "Paper in Sudanic Africa". In Jeppie, Shamil; Diagne, Souleymane Bachir (eds.). The meanings of Timbuktu (PDF). Cape Town: HSRC Press in association with CODESRIA : distributed in North America by IPG. ISBN 978-0-7969-2204-5. Archived from the original (PDF) on 2022-05-17.
- Hunwick, J. O. (1990). "An Andalusian in Mali: a contribution to the biography of Abū Ishāq al-Sāhilī, c. 1290–1346". Paideuma. 36: 59–66. JSTOR 40732660.
- Levtzion, Nehemia; Hopkins, John F. P., eds. (2000) [1981], Corpus of Early Arabic Sources for West Africa, New York, NY: Marcus Weiner Press, ISBN 1-55876-241-8
