= John of Sicily =

John of Sicily may refer to:

- John of Sicily (astronomer)
- John II of Aragon, king of Sicily from 1458 to 1468
