= Hartwig Hirschfeld =

Prussian-born British Orientalist and educator (1854–1934)

- Born: 18 December 1854; Thorn, Province of Prussia, Kingdom of Prussia
- Died: 10 January 1934 (aged 79); London, England, United Kingdom
- Spouse: Pauline Loewe (m. 1890; died 1929)
- Children: Louis Hirschfeld (1893–1898); Rosamund Hirschfeld (b. 1895); Beatrice Amelie Hirschfeld (b. 1897); Dorothy Hirschfeld

Academic background
- Education: University of Strasburg
- Thesis: Jüdische elemente im Ḳorân: Ein beitrag zur Ḳorânforschung (1878)
- Doctoral advisor: Theodor Nöldeke

Academic work
- Institutions: Judith Lady Montefiore College; Jews' College; University College London
- Main interests: Oriental studies

Hartwig Hirschfeld MRAS (Hebrew: נַפְתָּלִי הַארְטְוִויג בֵּן אַהֲרֹן הִירְשְׁפֵלְד; 18 December 1854 – 10 January 1934) was a Prussian-born British Orientalist, bibliographer, and educator. His particular scholarly interest lay in Arabic Jewish literature and in the relationship between Jewish and Arab cultures. He is best known for his editions of Judah Halevi's Kuzari—which he published in its original Judeo-Arabic and in Hebrew, German and English translations—and his studies on the Cairo Geniza.

== Biography ==
Hartwig Hirschfeld was born to a Jewish family in Thorn, Prussia. His father, Dr. Aron Hirschfeld, was a rabbi from Dirschau, and his maternal grandfather was the distinguished rabbi Salomon Plessner. After graduating from the Royal Marien Gymnasium in Posen, Hirschfeld studied Oriental languages and philosophy at the University of Berlin, at the same time attending lectures at Azriel Hildesheimer's Rabbiner-Seminar. He received his doctorate from the University of Strasburg in 1878 and, after a year's compulsory service in the Prussian Army, he obtained a travelling scholarship in 1882 which enabled him to study Arabic and Hebrew at Paris under Joseph Derenbourg.

After teaching in Posen for a few years, Hirschfeld immigrated to England in 1889, where he became professor of Biblical exegesis, Semitic languages, and philosophy at the Montefiore College. In 1901, he was invited by the Syndicate of Cambridge University to examine the Arabic fragments in the Taylor-Schechter collection. That same year, he was appointed librarian and professor of Semitic languages at Jews' College, a position he occupied until 1929. At the same time, he became a lecturer in Semitic epigraphy at University College London in 1903, a lecturer in Ethiopic in 1906, and full professor and Goldsmid Lecturer in Hebrew there in 1924.

== Publications ==
Hirschfeld's publications include a German translation of Judah Halevi's Kuzari, relying on the Arabic original (1885); a critical edition of the Arabic text and the Hebrew translation by Judah ibn Tibbon (1887); an English translation (1905), of which a revised edition appeared in 1932; Arabic Chrestomathy in Hebrew Characters (1892); the Al-Sab'iniyya, an Arabic philosophic poem by Musa ibn Tubi (1894); Beiträge zur Erklärung des Koran (1886), elaborated into New Researches into the Composition and Exegesis of the Koran (1902); the Hebrew translation of the Book of Definitions by Isaac Israeli (1896); Yefet ben Ali's commentary on the Book of Nahum (1911); Sketch of Hebrew Grammar (1913); Qirqisānī Studies (1918); An Ethiopic-Falasi Glossary (1921); Commentary on Deuteronomy (1925); and Literary History of Hebrew Grammarians and Lexicographers (1926). Among his bibliographical writings are a Descriptive Catalogue of the Hebrew MSS. of the Montefiore Library (1904). Hirschfeld also contributed articles to numerous periodicals, most notably a series of essays on the Arabic fragments in the Cairo Geniza in the Jewish Quarterly Review (1903–1908).
