= Said al-Andalusi =

Arab qadi of Toledo in Muslim Spain (1029–1070)

Ṣāʿid al-Andalusī (صاعِدُالأندلسي)
- Born: 1029; Almería, Al-Andalus
- Died: 1070 (aged 40–41); Toledo, Al-Andalus
- Other name: Abū al-Qāsim Ṣāʿid ibn Abū al-Walīd Aḥmad ibn Abd al-Raḥmān ibn Muḥammad ibn Ṣāʿid ibn ʿUthmān al-Taghlibi al-Qūrtūbi (صاعِدُ بنُ أحمدَ بن عبد الرحمن بن محمد بن صاعدٍ التَّغْلِبيُّ)

Academic background
- Influences: Abū Muḥammad ibn Hazm (أبي محمد بن حَزْم)

Academic work
- Era: Banu Dhiʼb-n-Nun dynasty, Umayyad Caliphate
- Main interests: astronomy, science, philosophy, universal history
- Notable works: Ṭabaqāt al-‘Umam
- Influenced: Al-Qifti

Ṣāʿid al-Andalusī (Arabic: صاعِدُ الأندلسي), in full Abū al-Qāsim Ṣāʿid ibn Abū al-Walīd Aḥmad ibn Abd al-Raḥmān ibn Muḥammad ibn Ṣāʿid ibn ʿUthmān al-Taghlibi al-Qūrtūbi (صاعِدُ بنُ أحمدَ بن عبد الرحمن بن محمد بن صاعدٍ التَّغْلِبيُّ) (1029 – July 6, 1070 AD; 420 – 6 Shawwal, 462 AH), was an Arab qadi of Toledo in al-Andalus, who wrote on the history of science, philosophy and thought. He was a mathematician and scientist with a special interest in astronomy and compiled a famous biographic encyclopedia of science that quickly became popular in the empire and the Islamic East.

== Life ==
Ṣāʿid al-Andalusī was born in Almería in al-Andalus during the Dhulnunid dynasty and died in Toledo. His Arab origins came from the tribe of Taghlib and his family had fled Cordova to take refuge in Almería during the civil war. His grandfather had been qadi (judge) of Sidonia and his father was qadi of Toledo until he died in 1057 when Ṣāʿid succeeded him.

The early biographers ibn Bashkuwal, Abu Ja'far Ahmad ibn Yahya al-Dabbi, al-Safadi and Ahmad al-Maqqari tell us Ṣāʿid's teachers in Toledo were ibn Hazm, al-Fataḥ ibn al-Qāsim (الفَتْح بن القاسم), and Abū Walīd al-Waqshi (أبو الوليد الوَقّشِي). He was educated in fiqh (Islamic law) first in Almería, then Córdoba, before graduating, it seems, in Toledo in 1046, aged eighteen. Toledo was then a great centre of learning and Ṣāʿid studied fiqh (law), tafsir (Qu'ranic exegesis), Arabic, and Arabic literature. His teacher, Abū Isḥaq Ibrāhīm ibn Idrīs al-Tajibī, directed him towards mathematics and astronomy, in which he excelled.

While qāḍi of Toledo under Governor Yaḥyā al-Qādir, he continued this work and produced several scholarly works that contributed to the Toledan Tables. He taught and directed astronomical research to a group of young scholars, precision-instrument-makers, astronomers and scientists – including the renowned al-Zarqali – and encouraged them to invent. Their research also contributed to the Toledan Tables.

== Works ==
- Iṣlāh Ḥarakāt an-Najūn (اصلاح حركات النجوم) on the correction of earlier astronomical tables;
- Jawāmiʿ akhbār al‐umam min al‐Arab wa‐l Ajam (جوامع أخبار الأمم من العرب والعجم; 'Universal History of Nations – Arab and Non‐Arab') (Note: These three titles on history and astronomy are mentioned among his works in Tabaqāt.)
- Ṭabaqāt al-‘Umam (طبقات الأمم), a classification of the sciences and of the nations (The only extant work), written in 1068 two years before his death.
- Rectification of Planetary Motions and Exposition of Observers' Errors; An astronomical treatise.
- Maqālāt ahl al‐milal wa-l-nihal (مقالات أهل الملل والنحل; 'Doctrines of the Adherents of Sects and Schools'),
- Kitāb al-Qāsī (كتاب القاصى), 'Book of Minor' (Note: Mentioned by al-Qifṭī in the account of the astronomer al-Battānī in his Ta’rīkh al-Ḥukamā’ .)

=== Tabaqāt al-ʼUmam (Categories of Nations) ===
The Ṭabaqāt al-ʼUmam (Tabaqāt) composed in 1068 is an early "history of science" that comprises biographies of the scientists and scientific achievements of eight nations. In the field of nations are the Indians, Persians, Chaldeans, Egyptians, Greeks, Byzantines, Arabs and Jews (in contrast to others not disposed, such as Norsemen, Chinese, Africans, Russians, Alains and Turks). Ṣāʿid offers an account of the individual contribution each nation makes to the various sciences of arithmetic, astronomy, and medicine, etc., and of the earliest scientists and philosophers, from the Greeks, – Pythagoras, Socrates, Plato and Aristotle (Note: Ṣāʿid singles out Aristotle for particular praise saying of him: "No one can object if Allāh/Assembled the world in one individual".) – to the Roman and Christian scholars of the 9th and 10th centuries in Baghdad. The second half of the book contains Arab-Islamic contributions to the fields of logic, philosophy, geometry, the development of Ptolemaic astronomy, observational methods, calculations in trigonometry and mathematics to determine the length of the year, the eccentricity of the Sun's orbit, and the construction of astronomical tables, etc.

The Ṭabaqāt al-ʼUmam has been transcribed and translated into many different languages in many periods and cultures. The original document is not extant and discrepancies in the translations creates problems for historians, including variations in the title of the book. Discrepancies in the content of the editions appear with some versions omitting words, sentences, paragraphs or entire sections. Some omissions or variations may have arisen through scribal error, or difficulties of direct translation, while others arose, perhaps deliberately, out of the political, religious, or nationalistic sensibilities of the translators.

== Bibliography ==
- Andalusí (al-), Said (1991). Science in the Medieval World: "Book of the Categories of Nations. Translated by Sema'an I. Salem; Alok Kumar. University of Texas Press. ISBN 0-292-71139-5.
- Andalusī (al-), Ṣā'id ibn Aḥmad (1912). Cheikho, Louis (ed.). Kitāb Ṭabaqāt al-'Umam (in Arabic). Bayrūt: al-Maṭbaʻah al-Kāthūlīkīyah.
- Andalusī (al-), Ṣā'id ibn Aḥmad (2000). Llavero Ruiz, Eloísa; Martínez Lorca, Andrés (eds.). Historia de la filosofía y de las ciencias o Libro de las categorías de las naciones (Kitāb Ṭabaqāt al-'Umam) (in Spanish). Madrid: Trotta, D.L. ISBN 9788446010920. OCLC 803658443.
- Andalusī (al-), Ṣā'id ibn Aḥmad (1999). Maíllo Salgado, Felipe (ed.). Libro de las categorías de las naciones : vislumbres desde el Islam clásico sobre la filosofía y la ciencia (in Spanish). Tres Cantos, Madrid: Akal. OCLC 1024023889.
- Andalusī (al-), Ṣā'id ibn Aḥmad (1996). Kumar, Alok; I Salem, Semaan (eds.). Science in the medieval world: "Book of the categories of nations". Austin: University of Texas Press. OCLC 911294124.
- Andalusī (al-), Ṣā'id ibn Aḥmad (1999). Cheikho, Louis; Blachère, Regis; Sezgin, Fuat (eds.). Kitāb Ṭabaqāt al-'Umam. Frankfurt am Main, Germany: Institut für Geschichte der Arabisch-Islamischen Wissenschaften. OCLC 912195495.
- Andalusī (al-), Ṣā'id ibn Aḥmad (1975). Khan, M Saber (ed.). India in Hispano-Arabic literature: an eleventh century Hispano-Arabic source for ancient Indian sciences and culture. Calcutta: N. I.
- Ibn Bashkuwāl, ibn ʻAbd al-Malik (1966). Kitāb al-ṣilah (in Arabic). Cairo: al-Dār al-Miṣrīyah lil-Taʼlīf wa-al-Tarjamah. p. 321.
- Ibn ʻAmīrah, Aḥmad ibn Yaḥyá (1967), Bughyat al-multamis fī tārīkh rijāl ahl al-Andalus, Turāthunā Maktabah al-Andalusīyah (in Arabic), al-Qāhirah: Dār al-Kātib al-ʻArabī
- Joshua, Finkel (1927). An eleventh century source for the history of Jewish scientists in Mohammedan land (Ibn Ṣāʻid) (Microfilm ed.). Philadelphia: Dropsie College for Hebrew and Cognate Learning.
- Qifṭī, Jamāl al-Dīn Abū al-Ḥasan ‘Alī ibn Yūsuf (1903). Lippert, Julius (ed.). Ta'rīkh al-Ḥukamā' (in Arabic). Leipzig: Theodor Weicher.
- Ṣafadī (al-), Khalīl ibn Aybak (1962). Kitāb al-wāfī bi-al-wafayāt (in Arabic). Vol. 17. Wiesbaden: In Kommission bei Franz Steiner Verlag. p. 135.
- Sa`id al-Andalusi (1 March 1996). Science in the Medieval World ('Tabaqat al-'Umam'). Translated by Sema`an I. Salem; Alok Kumar. University of Texas Press. ISBN 978-0-292-70469-5.
- Ṣāʻid al-Andalusī (1935). Livre des catégories des nations. Régis Blachère (trans.). Larose Éditions.
