= Andalusian =

Andalusia is a region in Spain.

Andalusian may also refer to:

== Animals ==
- Andalusian chicken, a type of chicken
- Andalusian donkey, breed of donkey
- Andalusian hemipode, a buttonquail, one of a small family of birds
- Andalusian horse, a breed of horse

== Other uses ==
- Al-Andalus, a historical state on the Iberian Peninsula
- Al-Andalusi, an Arabic attributive title for people from Al-Andalus region
- Andalusian people, an ethnic group in Spain centered in the Andalusia region
- Andalusian Spanish, a dialect of Spanish (also called andaluz)
- Andalusian Arabic, a dialect of the Arabic language
- Andalusian cadence, a chord progression in music theory
- An Andalusian Dog, the English title of the film Un chien andalou

== See also ==
- Andalusi (disambiguation)
- Andalusia (disambiguation)
