= Bernard of Verdun =

13th-century author of Treatise on the Whole of Astronomy

Little is known of the life of Bernard of Verdun, except that he was a Franciscan friar who may have been born in Verdun and lived in the second half of the thirteenth century. His most significant work was the Treatise on the Whole of Astronomy (Tractatus super totam astrologiam), in which he defended Ptolemy's theory of epicycles and eccentrics against al-Bitruji's system of homocentric spheres. Contrary to the criticisms of Averroes and al-Bitruji, Bernard maintained that Ptolemy's theory was consistent with Aristotle's physics. He further pointed out many technical inadequacies of al-Bitruji's model, and considered it to be insufficiently developed to challenge Ptolemy's system.
