= George Lapithes =

Medieval Cypriot scholar

George Lapithes (fl. 1340s) was a medieval Cypriot writer, scholar and landowner.

Lapithes was a Greek Cypriot whose name is thought to have come from the town of Lapithos. He possessed a considerable amount of wealth due to his property ownership, which he used to enable his intellectual pursuits and pay for the release of Christian captives from the hands of the Turks. He hosted intellectuals of various origins at his "beautiful residence", where he debated ideas with them.

Lapithes was a prolific translator, but few of his works have survived to this day. He was credited by David Pingree as the likely translator of Toledan Tables from Latin to Greek.
