= John of Sicily (astronomer) =

John of Sicily (Note: Also known as: John of Messina, Johannes de Messina, Johannes de Sicilia, Johannes Siculus.) was an astronomer active in Paris in the late 13th century. His only known surviving work is Inter cetera veritatis philosophicae documenta, a Latin commentary on the instructional material, Quoniam cuiusque actionis, attached to the Toledan Tables. It was a popular work on trigonometry and planetary motion. It survives in ten complete manuscript copies and some further fragments. It was completed at Paris between 1291 and 1293 based in part on an earlier anonymous commentary, Sicut dicit Hermes. John also had access to the astronomical tables of Ibn Isḥāq al-Tūnisī.

A lost work by John may be referenced in the inventory made of the library of King Charles V of France shortly after his death in 1380. A copy of John's commentary is listed (Note: Scripta Johannis de Cicilia super canonez Azarchachelliz, Tabulas Tholetanas.) and under the same name an Almagest, (Note: Almagesti Johannis de Cicilia.) probably a work on planetary theory completed after the commentary.
