= Architecture of Mali =

The architecture of Mali is a distinct subset of Sudano-Sahelian architecture indigenous to West Africa. It comprises adobe buildings such as the Great Mosque of Djenné or the University of Timbuktu. It can be found all over the Sahel region of Africa. Malian architecture developed during the Ghana Empire, which founded most of Mali's great cities. They then flourished in West Africa's two greatest civilisations the Mali Empire and the Songhai Empire.

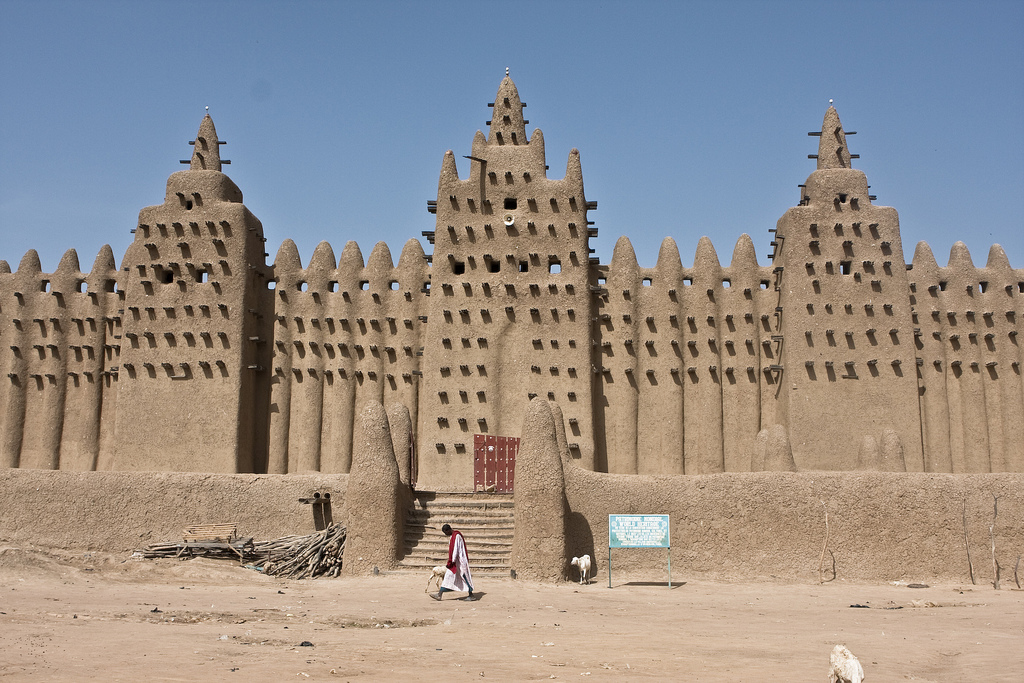
The Great Mosque of Djenné in Mali

Mali is located in West Africa, holding multiple different cultural and ethnic groups. In the current day, the vast majority of the population, three quarters, live rural areas, outside of cities, leading individuals to subside off of farming. The majority of Malian buildings hold little architectural importance due to their rural and survivalist nature, but within the population centers of Djenné, Bamako, and Timbuktu great architectural feats in what is known as Sudano-Sahelian architecture exist, mainly found within the Great Mosque of Djenné and palaces. Sudano-Sahelian architecture takes great influence from Muslim culture and West-African culture, forming a blend of cultures within Mali. Outside of local culture, Mali has a deeply rooted history of colonialism, resulting in French influence. Under French colonization, the French took control of current culture. French architecture can be found all throughout Mali, notably seen in the existence-of multiple large towers of the current day Great Mosque of Djenné.

== Mosques of Mali ==
Mosques are a common architectural typology and building program present in Mali. Typically, mosques consist of a prayer space and a mausoleum, merging multiple stages of life into a singular place of worship. In Malian mosque design, the organization is straightforward. These mosques consist of a basic, centralized courtyard, framed by aisles. Prayer halls are located at the ends of this courtyard. Many Malian mosques feature anthropomorphic characteristics that will interpret human bodily movements, typically mimicking praying figures and gestures. Aisles bordering the interior structure represent these bodily positions when one takes a prayer position. More specifically, the minaret represents the head. The centralized courtyard symbolizes the stomach. Galleries at the perimeter of the courtyard represent the feet. Lastly, the aisles serve as the arms.

== Great Mosque of Djenné ==
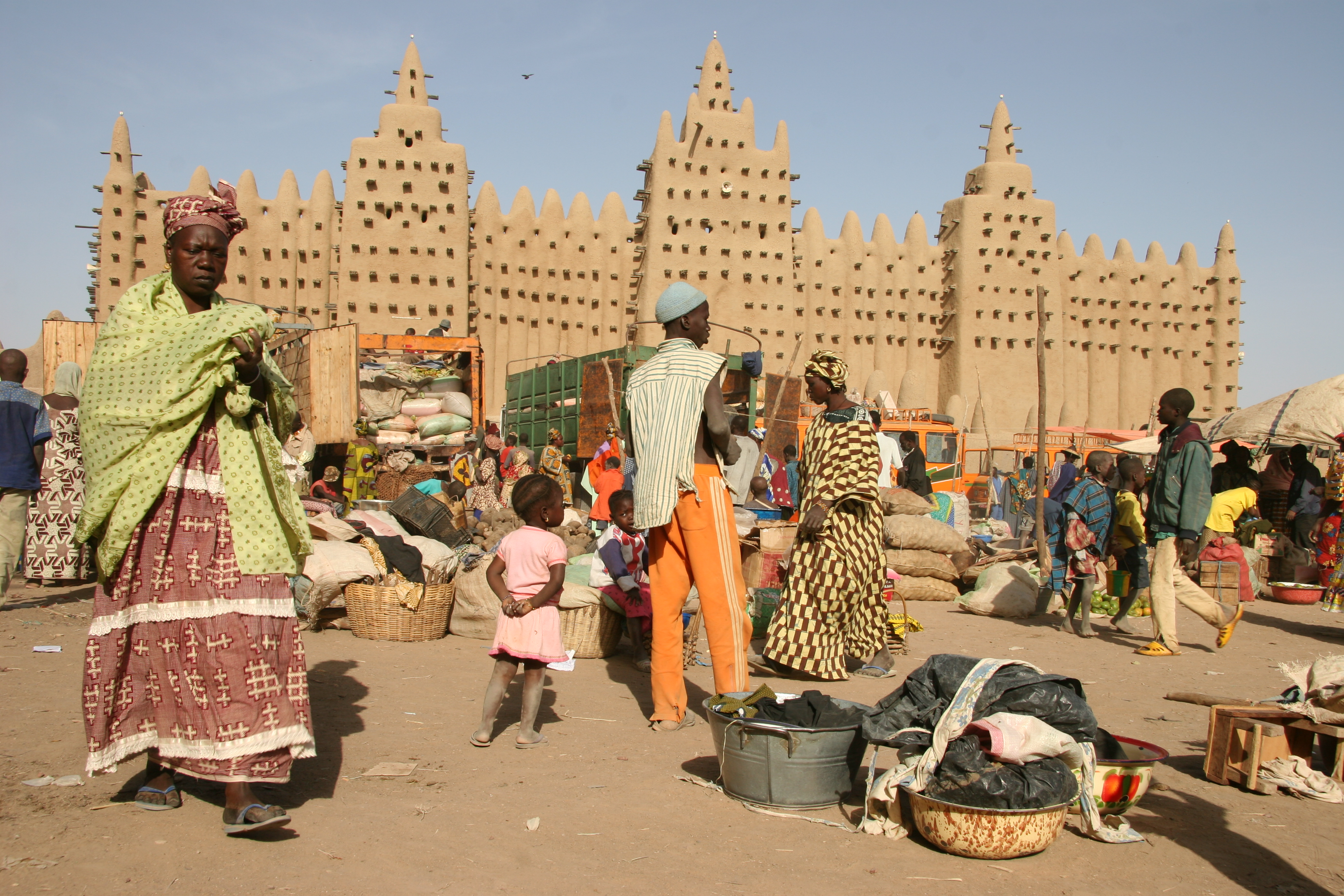
The Great Mosque of Djenne, current day

The Great Mosque of Djenné was first built in the 13th century, with its original construction date ranging between the years 1200 and 1300. The mosque has had multiple renditions and rebuilds, including an addition during the 1830s and a complete rebuild in 1906. The mosque is noted as the most important part of Malian and Islamic architecture, as it is crucial to understanding both current and historical norms.

During the 13th or 14th century, an unnamed sultan directed the towns efforts to take down a royal to be replaced with a mosque. The mosque was built as the main and only Mosque of Djenné, as the Sultan had shut down every other mosque in place of the Great Mosque of Djenné. Originally, only the mosque itself existed, followed by the building of the spiral towers and later on the surrounding walls. During the 1830s, an invading force, the Massina Empire under Seku Amadu, decided to close all mosques within Djenné and built a new addition to the Great Mosque right next to the original on the same grounds. At this time, the original mosque was in complete ruins and was only used as a graveyard and was in a state of disarray. Finally, in 1906, the city of Djenné decided to hold a total reconstruction of the original mosque and converted Amadu's mosque into a school. In this reconstruction, the Djenné government took architectural influence from French architecture within the inclusion of the large symmetrical towers located on the front of the mosque.

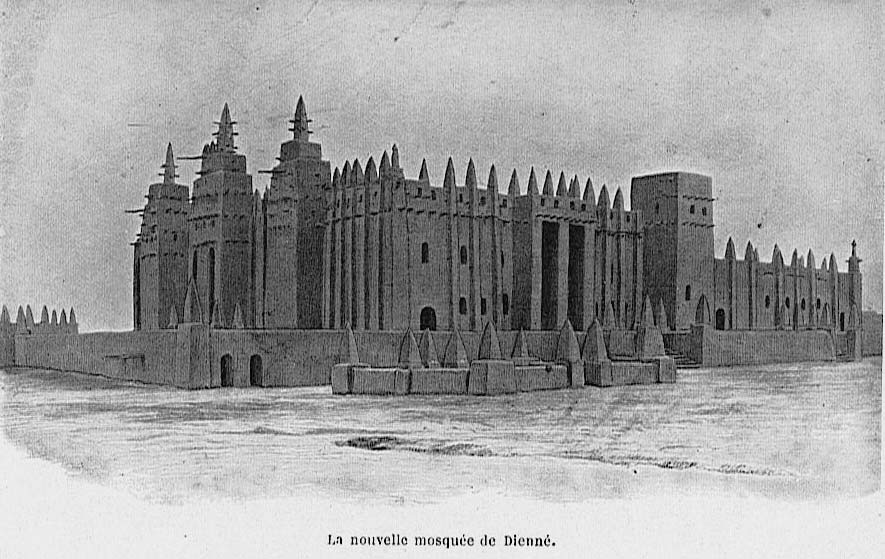
The Great Mosque of Djenne, 1911

Many of the buildings in Mali in pre-colonial times were influenced by the Islamic world and figures like Mansa Musa, with great architects helping to form the architectural style of the area. This is evident in the mud-brick and adobe style and the architectural designs of many of the mosques across the country. The architectural style is rich in the culture of Mali and its communities, with events like La fete de Crépissage, where community members participate in replastering the walls of the Great Mosque of Djenne. Each year, the walls of the Great Mosque are rebuilt in a celebration called Crépissage (roughly translating from French to a plastering). In this celebration, the people of Djenné gather together and throw and place wet mud at the walls of the mosque, refurbishing and fixing the easily damaged mud walls.

== Major cities ==
Bamako:

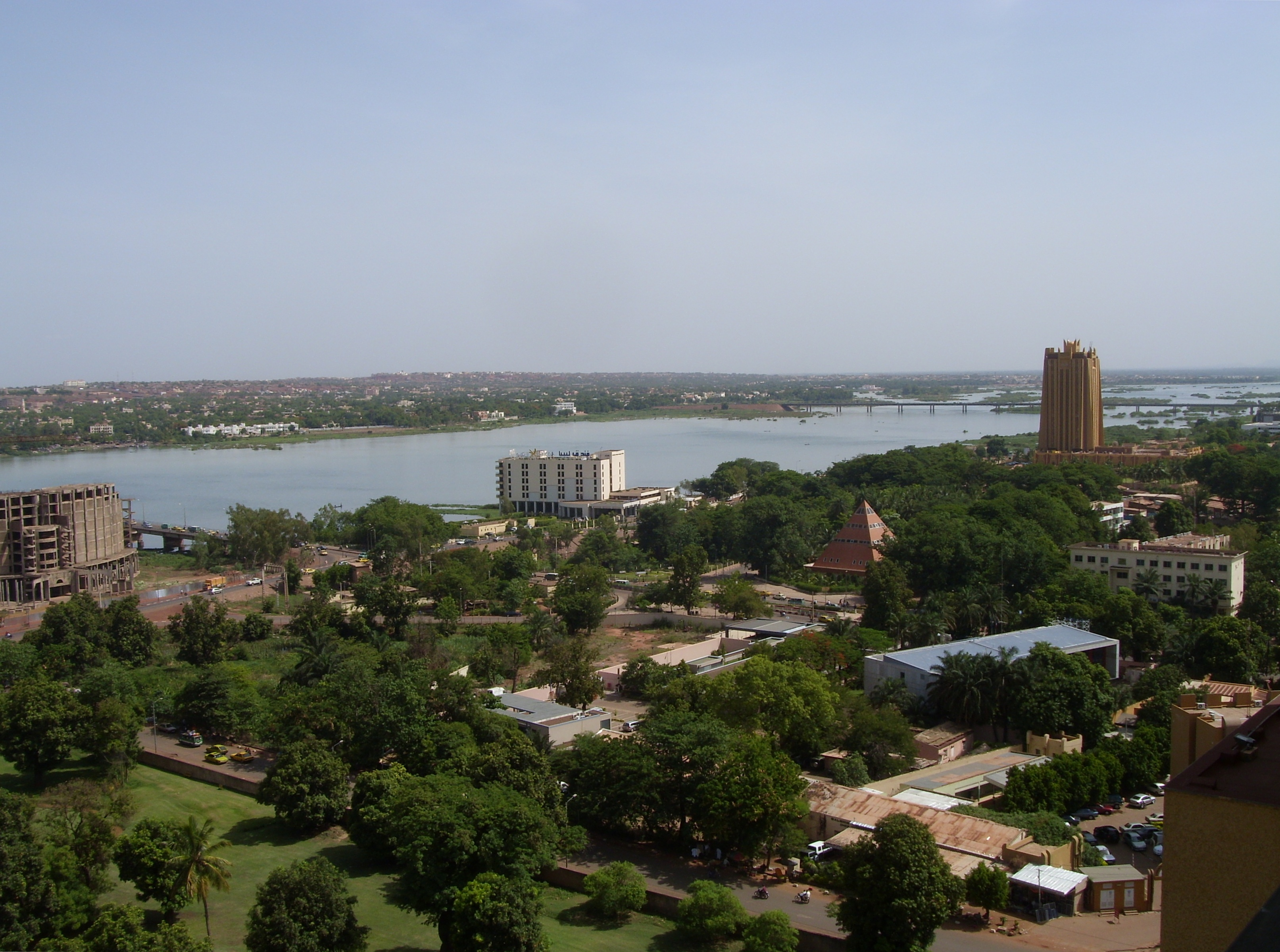
Bamako Mali

The capital city of Mali is Bamako, which is located in the southwest region near the Niger rivers. The current population is estimated to be around 3,000,000. Bamako's name stands for alligator (Bama) and river (Ko) based on its placement next to the Niger rivers.

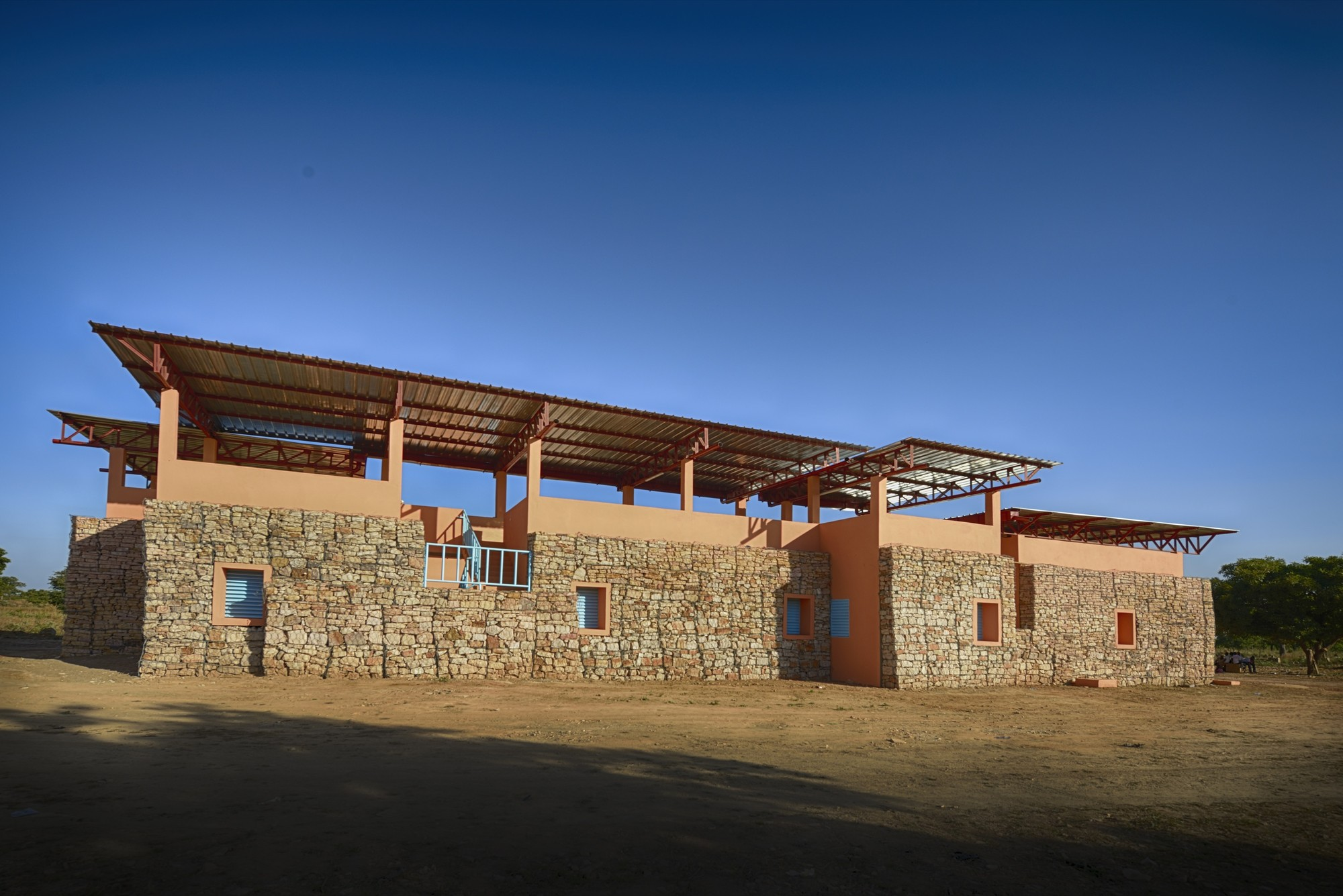
Falatow Jigiyaso orphanage

Bamako is well known for its architecture and layouts to provide a more functional building. One of these well known buildings is an orphanage called Falatow Jigiyaso which was built in 2012. It was a very hard process to build the orphanage based on location and climate conditions, however the project was backed by the mayor of Fresnes, which is a city south of Paris, so it did help considerably with the amount of funds. Relating to the climate in Mali and harsh weather conditions, it was a purposeful choice to not put air conditioning inside, but to combat the heat waves there was a second roof placed over the blocks. The walls of the orphanage are made out of concrete blocks, and inside of the blocks is a mixture called Banco (a mix of mud and grain husks) to keep it together and help cool down the inside of the rooms. It is said that the blocks have proven to cool down the temperature in the rooms around 20 degrees from outside. Overall, the orphanage is in the layout of an H which allows the students to move around the building without having to go outside, and is functional in style and comfort.

Timbuktu:

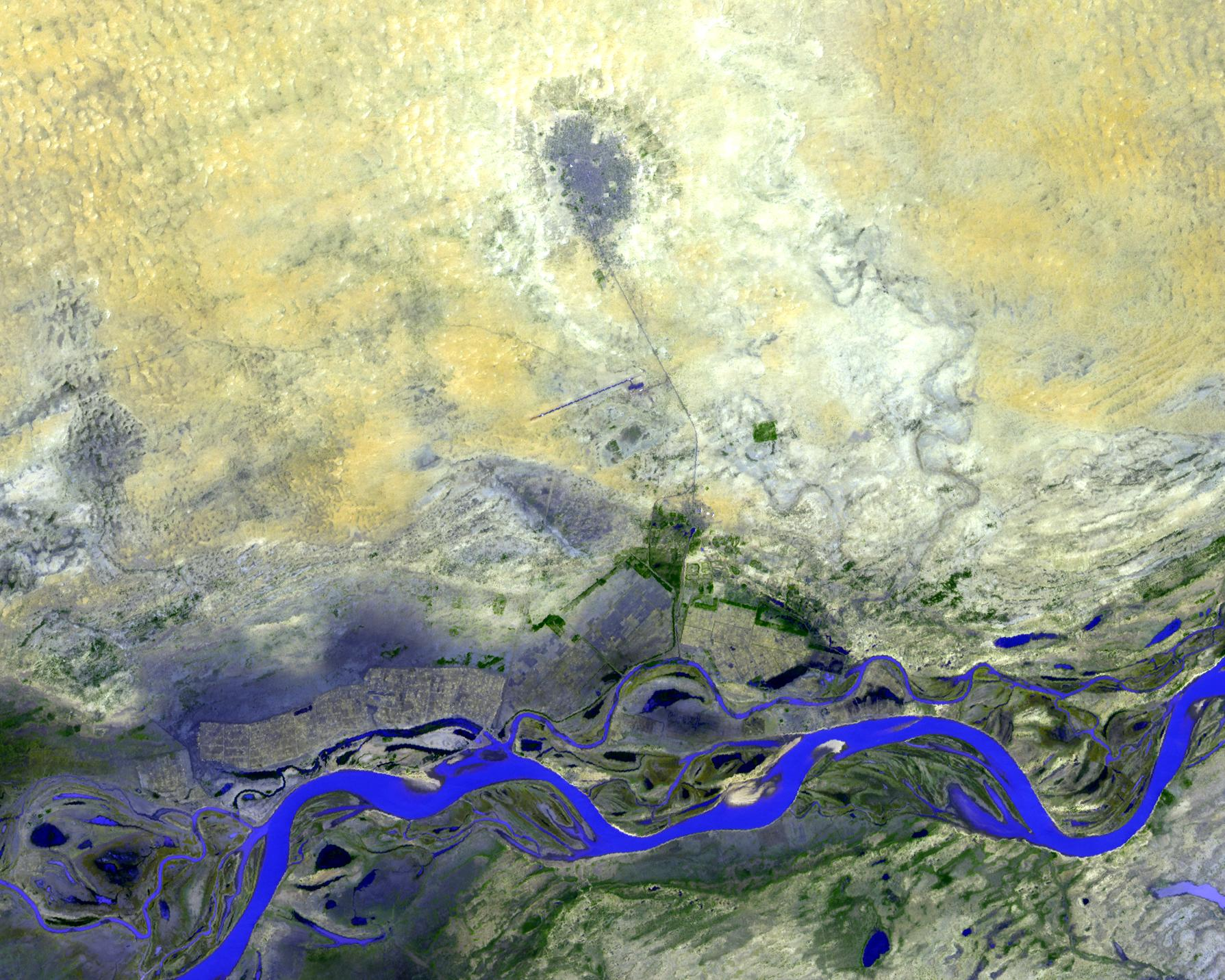
Timbuktu Mali

Timbuktu is another well known city in Mali, with a recorded population of 30,000 in 2020 and it is located on the edge of the Sahara Desert and the Niger River. It used to be known as the place for commerce because of its accessibility for people to get to. The advanced supply of water from the river contributes the materials used in the buildings (such as mud bricks). Like Bamako, the architecture in Timbuktu has very distinguishable features.

The masajids (mosques) of Sankore, Djinguereber, and Sidi Yahya were the centres of learning in medieval Mali and produced some of the most famous works in Africa, the Timbuktu Manuscripts.

Most of the architecture present in this region is commentary on the history and evolution of human beings. These architectural mosques are organized in a manner referencing bodily movements. Common materials used in construction are natural, earthen materials that also pay homage to its ancestral presence. The “body acts as an organizational template for a building's interior layout.” Ultimately, these architectural forms are derived from an individual level but align with the cosmos, revealing an intricate spiritual system.

Structurally speaking, the architecture has been redefined during the Sonhai reign. Protective, strong materials are utilized to protect the sun-brick adobe structures.

== Architectural materiality ==
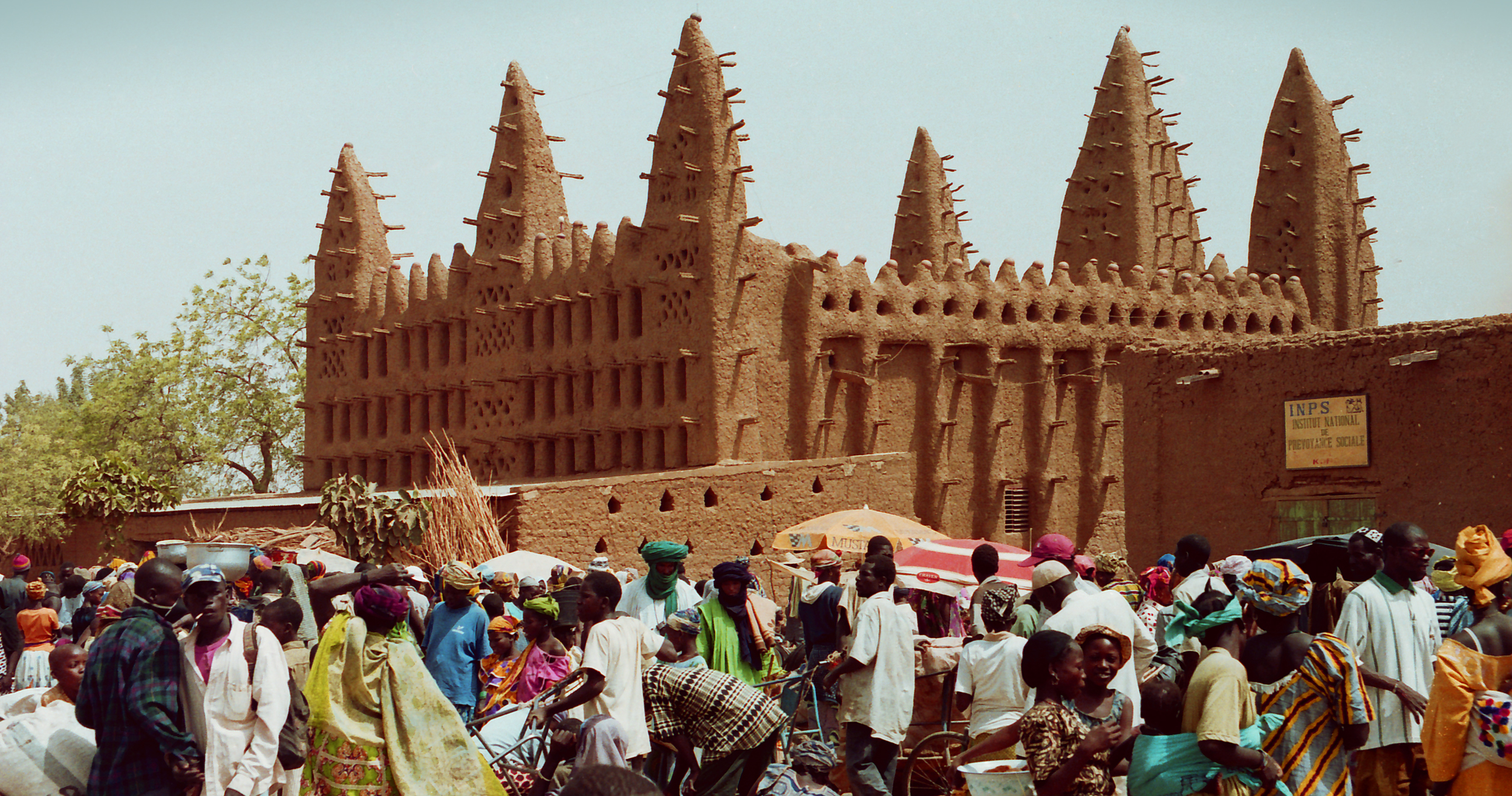
The Grand Mosque of Koro, built in 1964 in the Sudano-Sahelian architectural style.

Many of the most significant architectural wonders seen in Mali today were built in the style of Sudano-Sahelian architecture, most importantly the Great Mosque of Djenné. This style comprises mudbrick, known as ferey in the region, and adobe plaster in conjunction with wooden support beams, materials derived from Mali's natural surroundings. The plaster gives buildings a "smooth, rounded, organic look" before the scaffolding beams are added in. Many structures are composed of basic earth materials which innately have effective thermodynamic qualities. This is best seen in the city of Djenné, where most of the buildings are built using these earthen bricks, which are sun-baked and then covered with mud from nearby rivers. These material choices allow structures to remain cool throughout the day and hot during the night, and are a unique way to preserve the structural integrity of buildings. This is possible because the brick will absorb heat throughout the hot period of the day, then later radiate it to the interiors as the brick cools down overnight. The cool brick will radiate into the building throughout the day, as the brick heats in the sun. In the Great Mosque of Djenné, the mudbrick walls are rebuilt annually, or rather given a new coat of mud each year. In Mali in particular, a trademark of this architectural style is the appearance of protruding wooden beams, which are initially used as scaffolding for the builders to place the new mudbrick and plaster but are kept in place after the fact. It provides scaffolding for annual replastering events of Mali buildings. These sticks protruding from the larger planes also enable moisture to be wicked away from the bricks. These earthen buildings are constantly altered by natural forces, causing them to acclimate to the surrounding environment.

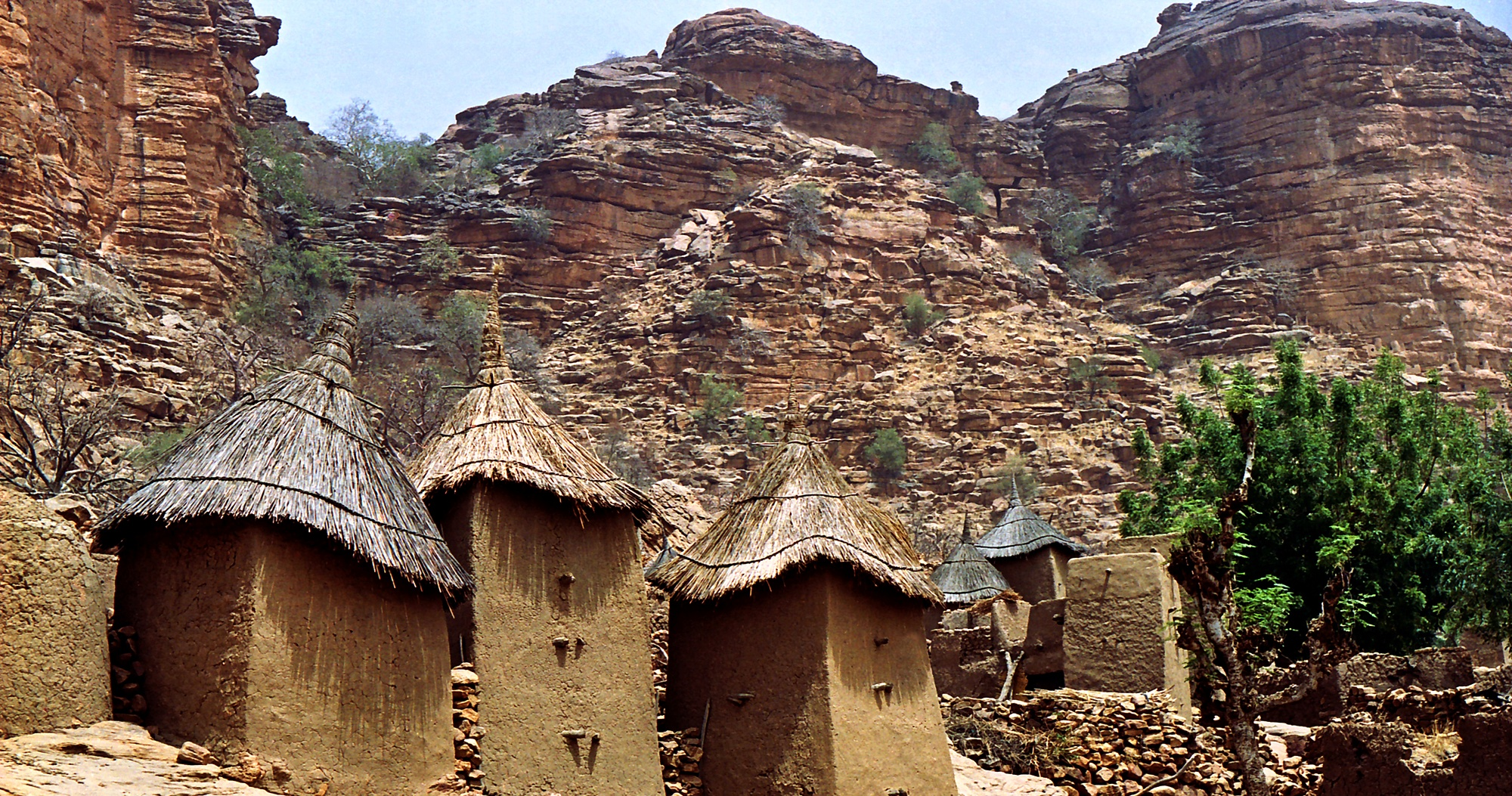
Traditional houses in Bandiagara, Mali

In addition to the larger landmarks, many of the normal buildings and living spaces across the country are built in this same style. Mudbrick houses are usually two stories, utilizing flat roofs and a central courtyard. The mudbrick walls take on most of the weight of the building, leading to smaller windows and doors and dim interiors. These residences must be replastered often, at a minimum of every two years. Higher-class citizens live in large courtyard-houses that are sectioned up into men's and women's areas. Traditionally, residences like these include a so-called "Sudan Façade" that prioritizes pillars and decorative entrances. Decoration like this is also more prominent on the sides of public buildings that face the rich areas, like the north side of the Great Mosque of Djenne.

Outside of the materials, Malian architecture also takes use of nature. Structures are frequently modeled after natural occurrences including wind, water and organic growth, like tree trunks. In addition to the practicality of these materials, they also have symbolism. The points of structural intersection align with anatomical and spiritual ideologies present in this region.

Mali has been a cultural melting pot for centuries, with a rich history of many different peoples occupying it. Inhabited since at least 250 BCE, it has been part of the Ghana Empire, the Mali Empire, and the Songhai Empire and also holds the architectural wonders of times of control by neighboring peoples like the Moroccans. Moreover, the French neo-Sudanese architectural style is seen during their occupation of the area. While many of the important buildings that the French put up are still there, the people in Mali tore down many of the statues of explorers and the signs of the time where they were under French colonial rule. However, France's choice to build and renovate landmarks in the style of the surrounding community led to a number of monuments of colonial time still present today. More recently, many of Mali's architectural heritage sites have been recognized by UNESCO, including multiple sites discussed above like the Great Mosque of Djenne.
