= Andalusi =

Andalusi is an adjective referring to anything of al-Andalus.

It may refer to:

- al-Andalusi, a surname or nisba
- Andalusi Arabic, the Arabic of al-Andalus
- Andalusi architecture
- Andalusi classical music

== See also ==
- Andalusian (disambiguation)
