= Abu al-Majd ibn Abi al-Hakam =

Arab physician, musician and astrologer

- Born: Andalusia
- Died: 1174 CE; Damascus, Syria
- Occupations: Physician, Musician, Astrologer

Abu al-Majd ibn Abi al-Hakam Ubaydullah Ibn al-Muzaffar al-Bahili (Arabic: أفضل الدولة أبو المجد محمد بن أبي الحكم عبيد اللَّه بن المظفر بن عبد اللَّه الباهلي; d. 1174 CE) was an Andalusian-Arab physician, musician and astrologer of the Islamic Golden Age who lived in Damascus, Syria.

When Nur ad-Din Zangi founded the Bimaristan in Damascus, he entrusted the medical care of the patients to Abu al-Majd ibn Abi al-Hakam. Of Ibn Abi al-Hakam, the historian Ibn Abi Usaybi'a states that he:

used to examine the patients at the hospital, take note of their condition and listen to their complaints in the presence of the nurses and porters, who were charged with looking after them. All methods of treatment and prescriptions which he gave were carried out to the letter. After finishing his ward round, he would pass on to a magnificently furnished hall to consult there various scientific works...There all physicians and students gathered round him in order to discuss medical points. When he had asked questions of his pupils and worked for about three hours in the wards and in the library, he would return to his home".
