= Al-Zarqali =

Muslim astrologer, and astronomer

Abū Ishaq Ibrahim al-Zarqali
- Fictional portrait by Eulogia Merle for the Fundación Española para la Ciencia y la Tecnología (2011)

Personal life
- Born: 1029 CE Toledo
- Died: 1100 Cordoba, Al-Andalus
- Era: Islamic Golden Age
- Region: Al-Andalus, Taifa of Toledo
- Notable work: Tables of Toledo

Religious life
- Religion: Islam

Abū Isḥāq Ibrāhīm ibn Yaḥyā al-Naqqāsh al-Zarqālī al-Tujibi (Arabic: إبراهيم بن يحيى الزرقالي); also known as Al-Zarkali or Ibn Zarqala (1029–1100), was an Arab maker of astronomical instruments and an astrologer from the western part of the Islamic world.

Although his name is conventionally given as al-Zarqālī, it is probable that the correct form was al-Zarqālluh. In Latin he was referred to as Arzachel or Arsechieles, a modified form of Arzachel, meaning 'the engraver'. He lived in Toledo, Al-Andalus before moving to Córdoba later in his life. His works inspired a generation of Islamic astronomers in Al-Andalus, and later, after being translated, were very influential in Europe. His invention of the Saphaea (a perfected astrolabe) proved very popular and was widely used by navigators until the 16th century.

The crater Arzachel on the Moon is named after him.

== Life ==
Al-Zarqālī, of Arab origin, was born in a village near the outskirts of Toledo, the then capital of the newly established Taifa of Toledo. He started work after 1048 under Said al-Andalusi for the Emir Al-Mamun of Toledo and also under Al-Mu'tamid of the Taifa of Seville. Assuming a leading position under Said, Al-Zarqālī conducted solar observations for 25 years from 1050.

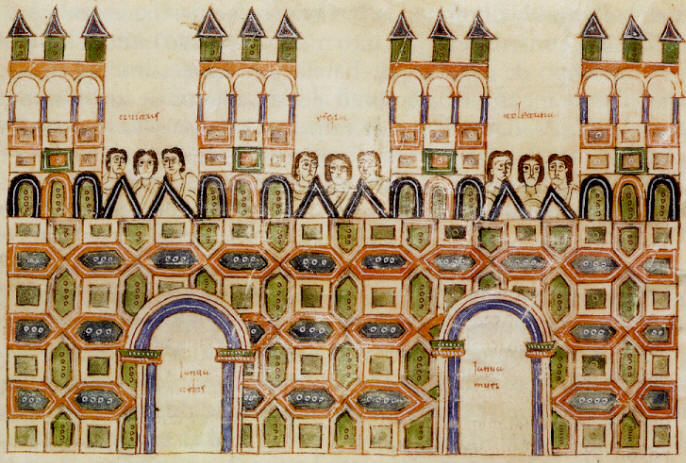
Art from Toledo in Al-Andalus depicting the Alcázar in the year 976.AD

He was trained as a metalsmith and due to his skills he was nicknamed Al-Nekkach "the engraver of metals". His Latinized name, 'Arzachel' is formed from the Arabic al-Zarqali al-Naqqash, meaning 'the engraver'.

He was particularly talented in geometry and astronomy. He is known to have taught and visited Córdoba on various occasions, and his extensive experience and knowledge eventually made him the foremost astronomer of his time. Al-Zarqālī was also an inventor, and his works helped to put Toledo on the intellectual center of Al-Andalus. He is also referred to in the works of Chaucer, as 'Arsechieles'.

In the year 1085, Toledo was taken by the Christian king of Castile Alfonso VI. Al-Zarqālī and his colleagues, such as Al-Waqqashi (1017–1095) had to flee. It is unknown whether the aged Al-Zarqālī fled to Cordoba or died in a Moorish refugee camp.

His works influenced Ibn Bajjah (Avempace), Ibn Tufail (Abubacer), Ibn Rushd (Averroës), Ibn al-Kammad, Ibn al-Haim al-Ishbili and Nur ad-Din al-Betrugi (Alpetragius).

In the 12th century, Gerard of Cremona translated al-Zarqali's works into Latin. He referred to Al-Zarqali as an astronomer and magician. Ragio Montanous wrote a book in the 15th century on the advantages of the Sahifah al-Zarqalia. In 1530, the German scholar Jacob Ziegler wrote a commentary on one of al-Zarqali's works. In his "De Revolutionibus Orbium Coelestium", in the year 1530, Nicolaus Copernicus quotes the works of al-Zarqali and Al-Battani.

== Science ==
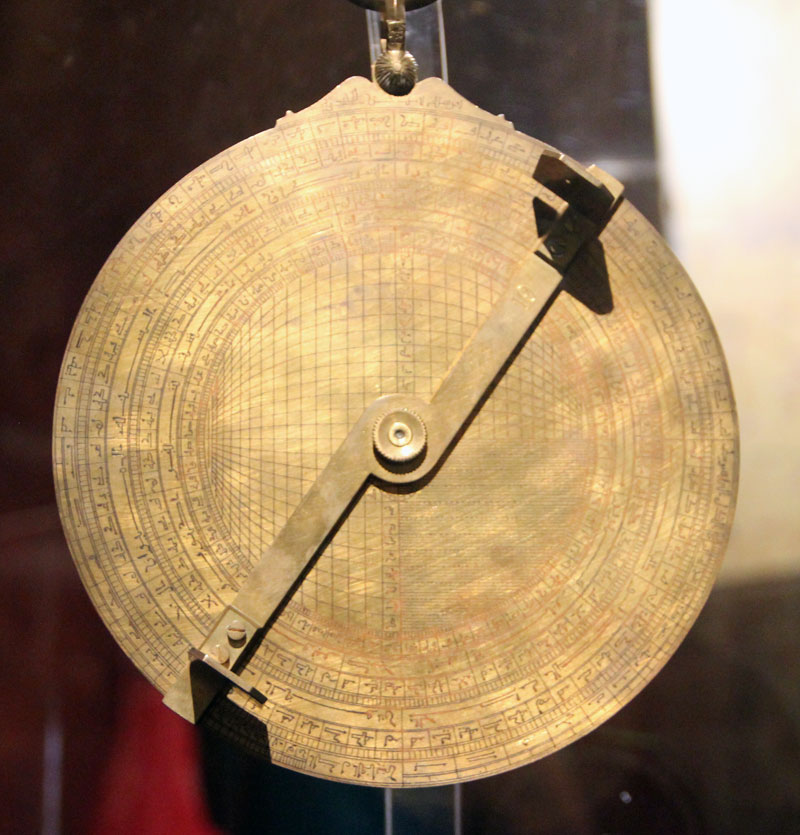
A copy of al-Zarqālī's astrolabe as featured in the Calahorra Tower.

=== Instruments ===
Al-Zarqālī wrote two works on the construction of an instrument (an equatorium) for computing the position of the planets using diagrams of the Ptolemaic model. These works were translated into Spanish in the 13th century by order of King Alfonso X in a section of the Libros del Saber de Astronomia entitled the "Libros de las laminas de los vii planetas".

He also invented a perfected kind of astrolabe known as "the tablet of al-Zarqālī" (al-ṣafīḥā al-zarqāliyya), which was famous in Europe under the name Saphaea.

There is a record of an al-Zarqālī who built a water clock, capable of determining the hours of the day and night and indicating the days of the lunar months. According to a report found in al-Zuhrī's Kitāb al-Juʿrāfīyya, his name is given as Abū al-Qāsim bin ʿAbd al-Raḥmān, also known as al-Zarqālī, which has made some historians think that this is a different person.

=== Theory ===
Al-Zarqali corrected geographical data from Ptolemy and Al-Khwarizmi. Specifically, he corrected Ptolemy's estimate of the width of the Mediterranean Sea from 62 degrees to the correct value of 42 degrees. In his treatise on the solar year, which survives only in a Hebrew translation, he was the first to demonstrate the motion of the solar apogee relative to the fixed background of the stars. He measured its rate of motion as 12.04 arcseconds per year, which is remarkably close to the modern calculation of 11.77 arcseconds. Al-Zarqālī's model for the motion of the Sun, in which the center of the Sun's deferent moved on a small, slowly rotating circle to reproduce the observed motion of the solar apogee, was discussed in the thirteenth century by Bernard of Verdun and in the fifteenth century by Regiomontanus and Peurbach. In the sixteenth century Copernicus employed this model, modified to heliocentric form, in his De Revolutionibus Orbium Coelestium.

=== Tables of Toledo ===
Al-Zarqālī also contributed to the famous Tables of Toledo, an adaptation of earlier astronomical data by Al-Khwarizmi and Al-Battani, to locate the coordinates of Toledo. His zij and almanac were translated into Latin by Gerard of Cremona in the 12th century, and contributed to the rebirth of a mathematically based astronomy in Christian Europe and were later incorporated into the Tables of Toledo in the 12th century and the Alfonsine tables in the 13th century.

Famous as well for his own Book of Tables, of which many had been compiled. Al-Zarqālī's almanac contained tables which allowed one to find the days on which the Coptic, Roman, lunar, and Persian months begin, other tables which give the position of planets at any given time, and still others facilitating the prediction of solar and lunar eclipses. This almanac that he compiled directly provided "the positions of the celestial bodies and need no further computation", it further simplifies longitudes using planetary cycles of each planet. The work provided the true daily positions of the sun for four Julian years from 1088 to 1092, the true positions of the five planets every 5 or 10 days over a period of 8 years for Venus, 79 years for Mars, and so forth, as well as other related tables.

In designing an instrument to deal with Ptolemy's complex model for the planet Mercury, in which the center of the deferent moves on a secondary epicycle, al-Zarqālī noted that the path of the center of the primary epicycle is not a circle, as it is for the other planets. Instead it is approximately oval and similar to the shape of a pignon (or pine nut). Some writers have misinterpreted al-Zarqālī's description of an earth-centered oval path for the center of the planet's epicycle as an anticipation of Johannes Kepler's sun-centered elliptical paths for the planets. Although this may be the first suggestion that a conic section could play a role in astronomy, al-Zarqālī did not apply the ellipse to astronomical theory and neither he nor his Iberian or Maghrebi contemporaries used an elliptical deferent in their astronomical calculations.

== Works ==
Major works and publications:

- Al Amal bi Assahifa Az-Zijia
- Attadbir
- Al Madkhal fi Ilm Annoujoum
- Rissalat fi Tarikat Istikhdam as-Safiha al-Moushtarakah li Jamiâ al-ouroud
- Almanac Arzarchel

== See also ==
- Islamic astronomy
- Islamic scholars
- List of Arab scientists and scholars
