= Mohammad Abbad Andaloussi =

Moroccan entrepreneur

Mohammad Abbad Andaloussi is a social entrepreneur and former banker in Morocco. He is the founder of Al Jisr (the Bridge), an organization that fosters collaborations between private businesses, the government, and the school system, and of INJAZ Morocco, which works towards cultivating entrepreneurship among middle school, high school and college students. He worked at Wafabank for 34 years and was a director of Attijariwafa Bank Foundation for five years.

Andaloussi was born the youngest son in Fez to illiterate parents, and his father was a carpenter. His parents have produced four sons and two daughters in addition to him. Andaloussi was the first member of his family to attend university.

Andaloussi has founded several organizations that contribute to the education system in Morocco. He was elected an Ashoka: Innovators for the Public Fellow in 2007. He is also a Synergos Senior Fellow and was named the Schwab Social Entrepreneur of the Year in 2010 and received the Global Citizenship Award from the Clinton Foundation in 2011.
