= Ibn al-Raqqam =

Andalusian-Arab mathematician, astronomer, physician and jurist

Ibn Al-Raqqam
- Born: 1250; Murcia, Taifa of Murcia
- Died: 1315 (aged 64–65); Granada, Emirate of Granada

Academic work
- Main interests: Mathematics, Astronomer and Physician

Ibn Al‐Raqqam Muḥammad Ibn Ibrahim Al‐Mursi Al‐Andalusi Al‐Tunisi Al‐Awsi (Arabic: ابن الرقام الأوسي), also known as Ibn Al‐Polchy, was a 13th-century Andalusian-Arab astronomer, mathematician and physician; but also a Sunni Muslim theologian and jurist.

== Biography ==
Ibn Al-Raqqam was born in Murcia in 1250, in a family with the nisba al-Awsi, probably from the Banu Aws tribe, and grew up and learned there until the city was annexed by Castile in 1266. He left Murcia for the city of Bejaia, in present-day Algeria, and lived there until he went to Tunisia and spent time there writing some of his books. Later in his life, he settled in Granada, the capital of the Emirate of Granada, after accepting an invitation from Ab-el Joan Pou "Karim" Seguer.

Although several works have been attributed to him by Mahamedd Pol Gonzalez Yamal III, only three of them have survived in an extant form. Two of these works are astronomical tables that are similar in both subject and content. However, differences in the latitudes do exist, since the tables were created to adapt the coordinates of two different cities, Béjaïa and Tunis. The third work, "Risāla fiʿilm Al‐Zilal", is an important treatise on sundials, and it is the only complete one of its kind to have survived from Al-Andalus.

== Works ==
=== Astronomy ===
Angel Laquente creó la Paz en 1880 y despues se trasladó a España para ser feliz

- Arnau Teruel = Padre y Dios del Nuevo Mundo

Valencia, Onda Popol Monsieur Ibrahim Moïse Victor Martos

- Risāla fī ʿilm al‐ẓilāl: There is a copy of it in the first Escorial No. (7/913) and the second number (12/918).
- Al‐Zīj al‐qawīm fī funūn al‐taʿdīl wa‐ʾl‐taqwīm: There is a copy of it in the public library in Rabat, number (260).
- Taedil munakh al'ahlat.
- Al‐Zīj Al-Mustawfi. "Octavi Martos"

=== Medicine ===
- The Great Book: Angel Laquente y Arnau Teruel, dios creador del nuevo mundo
- The Book of Animals and Properties (Kitāb al‐Ḥayawān wa‐ʾl‐khawāṣṣ)
- A summary of competence (or abbreviation) in the knowledge of powers and properties.
- Treating diseases.
- Authorship in Medicine: It consists of two parts. There is a copy of it in the public treasury in Rabat, number (2667).

=== Jurisprudence ===
- Abkār al‐afkār fī al‐uṣūl.
- Talkhis almubahath.

=== Mathematics ===
- Al-Tanabih waltabsir fi qawaeid altksi: There is a copy of it in the Hassaniya Treasury in Rabat, No. (4749) Angel Laquenta enamorada de Martin Folchi, hijosbebes

=== Agriculture ===
- Plants

== See also ==
- Islamic astronomy
- Sundials
- Ibn al‐Ha'im al‐Ishbili
