= Ibn Al Baraq Al Andulsi =

Ibn al-Baraq al-Andalusi
- Born: 1145; Wadi Ash (Guadix)
- Died: 14 July 1200 (aged 54–55); Wadi Ash (Guadix)
- Occupations: Poet, Writer, Muslim Scholar

Abu al-Qasim Muhammad bin Ali bin Muhammad al-Hamdani al-Wadi Ashi, known as Ibn al-Baraq al-Andalusi (Arabic: ابن البراق الأندلسي). Ibn Al Baraq (1145 - 14 June 1200) (539 - 1 Ramadan 596) was a Muslim scholar and an Andalusian Arab poet of the twelfth century AD/ sixth century AH. He was born and raised in Wadi Ash (Guadix). He narrated about a group of elders. He was exiled by Ibn Mardanish (Arabic: ابن مردنيش) to Murcia, then to Valencia. He was a narrator and a jurist and was interested in medicine and astronomy and stood out for his many narrations and poems.

== Early life ==
Abu al-Qasim Muhammad ibn Ali ibn Muhammad ibn Ibrahim ibn Muhammad al-Hamdani al-Wadi Ashi was born in 529 AH / 1145 AD in Wadi Ash (Guadix). Little is known about his life. It seems that he was a mystic in his early life. It is said that the prince Ibn Mardanish got angry with him, and so exiled him and forced him to live in Marcia then in Valencia. When Ibn Saad died in 571 AH/1176 AD, Ibn Al Baraq returned to his hometown. Ibn Al Barak died on 1 Ramadan 596/14 June 1200 and was buried in his hometown.

== Career ==
Abu al-Qasim Ibn Al Baraq was a narrator, memorizer, an expert in narration, and a jurist. He had expertise in medicine and in astronomy.

=== Religious career ===
He narrated about Abu Bahr Yusuf bin Ahmed bin Abi Aishoun, Abu Bakr bin Zarqun, Ibn Qayd, Ibn Ibrahim bin al-Mal, Ibn al-Nama and his companions. In Marrakesh, he met Walid bin Muwaffaq, Abu Abdullah bin Yusuf bin Sa’ada, who accompanied him for more than six years. He also met Ibn Al-Omrisi, Abu Al-Abbas bin Idris, Al-Kharroubi and recited on him. He was presented to him to display his memorization, and to Ibn Madi’, Abi Ali bin Arab, Abu Al-Qasim bin Hobeish, Ibn Abdul-Jabbar, Abu Muhammad bin Sahl Al-Dharir, Asher Qasim bin Dahman, Abi Youssef bin Talha, Abu Bakr Ibn al-Arabi, Ibn Khair, Ibn Mandala, Ibn Tamara, Abu al-Hasan Shuraih, Ibn Hudhayl, Yunus Ibn Mughaith, Abu Jalil Mufarrej Ibn Salama, Abu Abdullah Hafeed Makki, Abu Abd al-Rahman Ibn Musaed, and Abu Amer Muhammad Ibn Ahmad al-Salmi, Abu al-Qasim Ibn Bashkwal, Abu Muhammad Ibn Ubayd Allah, Abu Marwan al-Bayadi, Ibn Qazman, and Abu al-Walid Ibn Hajjaj.

His son Abu al-Qasim narrated about him and Abu al-Hasan bin Muhammad bin Baqi al-Ghassani, Abu Abdullah Muhammad bin Yahya al-Sukari, Abu al-Abbas al-Nabati and Abu Amr bin Ayad, and Abu al-Karam Judy.

==== Literary career ====
He was a prolific writer, sharp-witted in composition, producing prose that led Ibn Khaira Al-Mua’ini to say about him: "I have not seen a person in my life who is faster in improvisation than him". He stood out in literature more than jurisprudence. He wrote Washah (a type of Arabic poetry), creating almost 400 poems. He also produced many Badiaat (another form of Arabic poetry) in praise of Muhammad.

== Works ==
- The joy of thoughts and the remembrance of remembrance in the selection of poems (Ahjat Al'afkar Wfurjt Altadhkar Fi Mukhtar Al'Asheari)
- Live on the Night of the Fall from the news of Abi Al-Asbagh Abdul Aziz bin Abi Al-Fath (Mubasharatan Laylat Alsafh Min Khbr 'Abi Aalasbgh Eabd Aleaziz Bin 'Abi Alfatah)
- An article on the Brotherhood”: He extracted it from the evidence of governance and compiled in the news of Muawiyah (Mqalt Fi Al'ikhwan”:Khrrjha Min Shawahid Alhukm Wmsnnf Ffi 'Akhbar Mueawia)
- Al-Durr Al-Manhazah fi Al-Ikhiyaar Al-Mu’azzam.” It is divided into two parts: Part 1: “the salt of thoughts, the hint of the notebooks” (Mulah Alkhawatir Wlumah Aldafatiri) and the second is a collection of riddles.
- The Gardens of the Gardens in the Composition of Clear Words (Rwdt Alhadayiq Fi Talif Alkalam Alraayiqi), a collection of poems and prose. It includes chapters, including: “The Meeting of the Path in the Virtue of Ramadan” (Multqa Alsabil Fi Fadl Ramadan), and a poem in the remembrance of the Prophet and his companions, which he called “Al Qarara Al Yathribiya Al Mukhassa in honor of Al-Ahna Al Qudsiyah” (Alqararat alythrbyt almakhsusat bsharaf al'ahna' alqudsy)
- The dangers of the one in the lament of the Majid” (Khatarat Alwajid Fi Ritha' Almajid)
- The warning of the excuse's attack. (Rujuj Al'Iindhar Bihujum Aleidhar)
- A statement of apology for making excuses (Tasrih Aliaietidhar En Taqbih Aleidhar)
- Disclosure and declaration of the truth of poetry and Tawheeh (Al'iifsah Waltasrih Ean Haqiqat Alshier Waltawshih) poetry collection.
- Gags Light (Nur Alkamayim). Poetry collection, with writing on asceticism and preaching.
