= Abu Ja'far Ahmad ibn Yahya al-Dabbi =

Andalusian encyclopedist-biographer

Abū Ja'far Aḥmad ibn Yaḥyá Ibn ʻAmīrah al-Dhabbī (أبو جعفر أحمد بن يحيى بن أحمد بن عميرة الضبيّ)
- Died: 599 AH / 1202–1203 AD
- Other name: Ibn Umaira al-Dhabbi

Academic work
- Main interests: al-Andalus, historian, Biographer
- Notable works: Bughyat al-multamis fī tārīkh rijāl ahl al-Andalus

Abū Ja'far Aḥmad ibn Yaḥyā ibn Aḥmad ibn 'Amirah al-Dhabbī (Arabic: أبو جعفر أحمد بن يحيى بن أحمد بن عميرة الضبيّ; died 599 AH [1202–1203 AD]) an historian and encyclopedist-biographer of al-Andalus who lived at the end of the twelfth-century during the period of Islamic hegemony in Spain.

== Biography ==
What is known of the author's life is drawn from the text of his published work. He says nothing about his country, but we believe that he was born in the village of Velez where he lived with his grandfather Ahmed, and that Ahmed ibn Abd 'l-Malik ibn Amirah was a cousin of Yahya, the author's father.

Adh-Dhabbi is believed to have spent most of his life in Murcia and Lorca; where from fourteen years of age, he began his studies under Mohammad ibn Jafar ibn Ahmed ibn Hamid, who died in the year 586 AH.

Adh-Dhabbi travelled to many regions of Spain and Africa, visiting the cities of Ceuta in Spain, and Alexandria in Egypt, where he found welcome among literary circles. Along his travels he met the philologist Abd al-Ḥaqq el-Ishbīli in Béjaïa, and fellow encyclopedist-biographer, Abu Ṭāhir Ibn 'Auf in Alexandria.

Ibnul Abbar in his work, titled At-Takmilah, recorded the death of Adh-Dhabbi as being crushed by a falling wall in Murcia and passing soon after being removed from the debris on the 25th of Rabi Aakhir 599/Jan 1203.

== Works ==
- Bughyat al-multamis fī tārīkh rijāl ahl al-Andalus (بغية الملتمس فى تاريخ رجال اهل الاندلس ء); Biographic encyclopedia of Arab Spain. (ed. Codera y Zaidín, Francisco; Ribera, Julián; Bibliotheca Arabico-Hispana, 1884) (al-Qāhirah Dār al-Kātib al-ʻArabī, 1967)

=== Translations ===
- Desiderium quaerentis historiam virorum populi Andalusiae, (Latin) descriptions of the lives of famous men and women in Spain, with preceding history of the conquest and the Umayyad Caliphs, until the year 592 AH / 1196 AD. Anthology of works by: 'Abd Allah ibn Muhammad, called Ibn al-Farad; Amad ibn Yaya, al-Dabb; Khalaf ibn Abd al-Malik, called Ibn Bashkuwl; Muammad ibn 'Abd Allah, called Ibn Al-Abbâr; Muhammad ibn Khair, al Andalus.
- De libro Desiderium quaerentis historiam hominum Andalusiae (Latin).

== See also ==
- List of Arab scientists and scholars
- Encyclopædia Britannica Online
