= Ya'ish ibn Ibrahim al-Umawi =

Spanish-Arab Mathematician (c.1400 - 1489)

Abū ʿAbdallāh Yaʿīsh ibn Ibrāhīm ibn Yūsuf ibn Simāk al-Andalusī al-Umawī (Arabic: يعيش بن إبراهيم بن يوسف بن سماك الأموي الأندلسي) (1400? in Al-Andalus – 1489 in Damascus, Mamluk Sultanate) was a 15th-century Spanish-Arab mathematician.

== Works ==
- Marasim al-intisab fi'ilm al-hisab ("On arithmetical rules and procedures"), first date written in 1373 and hence the birth date above is controversial.
- Raf'al-ishkal fi ma'rifat al-ashkal (a work on mensuration).

== Bibliography ==
- Saidan, A. S. (1970). "Al-Umawī, Abū 'Abdallāh Ya'īsh Ibn ibrāHīm Ibn Yūsuf Ibn Simāk Al-Andalusī". Dictionary of Scientific Biography. New York: Charles Scribner's Sons. ISBN 0-684-10114-9.
- Ahmad Salim Saidan (ed.), Yaish ibn Ibrahim al-Umawi, On arithmetical rules and procedures (Aleppo, 1981).
