= Gerard of Cremona =

Italian translator and astrologer (c. 1114–1187)

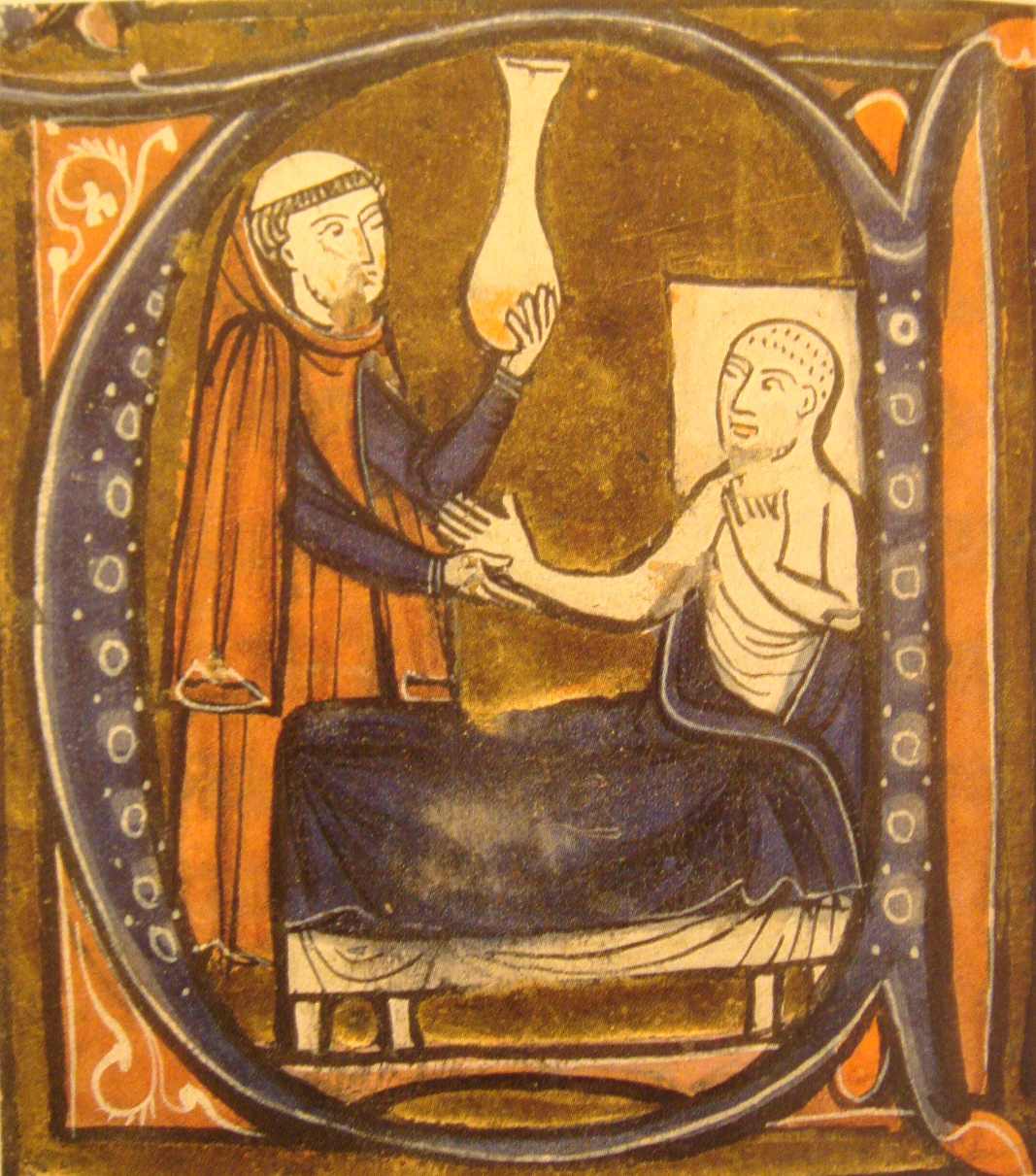
- European depiction of the Persian physician Rhazes, in Gerard of Cremona's Recueil des traités de médecine 1250–1260. Gerard de Cremona translated numerous works by Persian and Arab scholars.
- Born: 1114; Cremona, Italy
- Died: 1187 (aged 72–73); Toledo, Kingdom of Castile
- Occupation: Translator

Gerard of Cremona (Latin: Gerardus Cremonensis; c. 1114 – 1187) was an Italian translator of scientific books from Arabic into Latin. He worked in Toledo, Kingdom of Castile, and obtained the Arabic books in the libraries at Toledo. Some of the books had been originally written in Greek and, although well known in Byzantine Constantinople and Greece at the time, were unavailable in Greek or Latin in Western Europe. Gerard of Cremona is the most important translator among the Toledo School of Translators who invigorated Western medieval Europe in the twelfth century by transmitting the Arabs' and ancient Greeks' knowledge in astronomy, medicine and other sciences, by making the knowledge available in Latin. One of Gerard's most famous translations is of Ptolemy's Almagest from Arabic texts found in Toledo.

Confusingly, there appear to have been two translators of Arabic text into Latin known as Gerard of Cremona. The first was active in the 12th century and concentrated on astronomy and other scientific works, while the second was active in the 13th century and concentrated on medical works.

== Life ==
Gerard was born in Cremona in northern Italy. Dissatisfied with the philosophies of his Italian teachers, Gerard went to Toledo. There he learned Arabic, initially so that he could read Ptolemy's Almagest, which had a traditionally high reputation among scholars, but which, before his departure to Castile, was not yet known in Latin translation. The first Latin translation was made, from the Greek around 1160 in Sicily. Although we do not have detailed information of the date when Gerard went to Castile, it was no later than 1144.

Toledo, which had been a provincial capital in the Caliphate of Cordoba and remained a seat of learning, was safely available to a Catholic like Gerard, since it had been conquered from the Moors by Alfonso VI of Castile in 1085. Toledo remained a multicultural capital, insofar as its rulers protected the large Jewish and Muslim quarters, and kept their trophy city an important centre of Arab and Hebrew culture. One of the great scholars associated with Toledo was Rabbi Abraham ibn Ezra, Gerard's contemporary. Mozarabic culture was common in the area. The city was full of libraries and manuscripts, and was one of the few places in medieval Europe where a Christian could be exposed to Arabic language and culture.

In Toledo Gerard devoted the remainder of his life to making Latin translations from the Arabic scientific literature.

== Gerard's translations ==
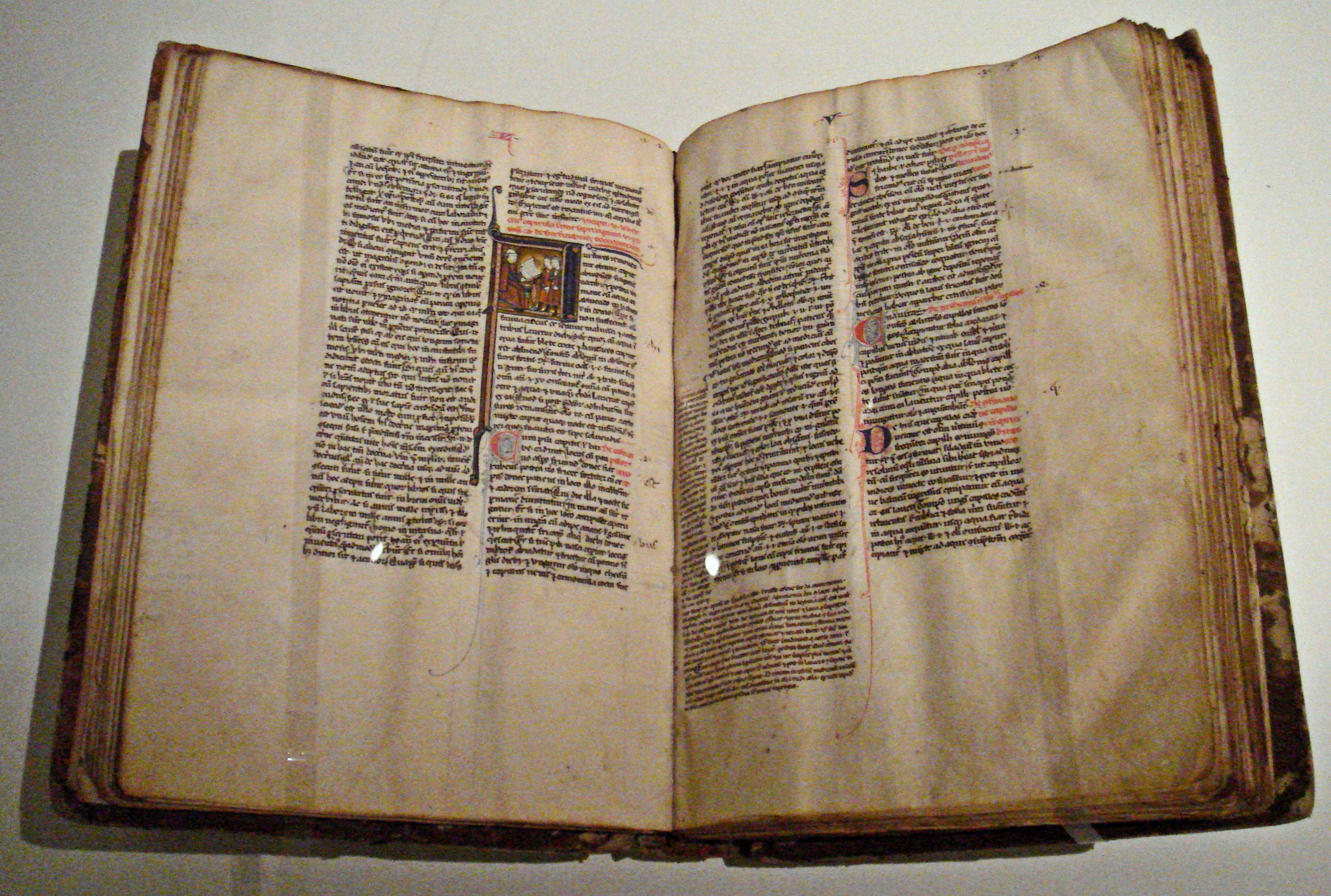
Al-Razi's Recueil des traités de médecine translated by Gerard of Cremona, second half of the 13th century.

Gerard of Cremona's Latin translation of the Arabic version of Ptolemy's Almagest made c. 1175 was the most widely known in Western Europe before the Renaissance. Unbeknownst to Gerard, an earlier translation of the Almagest had already been made in Sicily from the original Greek c. 1160 under the aegis of Henricus Aristippus, although this version was not as widely used in the Middle Ages as Gerard's version. George of Trebizond and then Johannes Regiomontanus retranslated it from the Greek original in the fifteenth century. The Almagest formed the basis for Western astronomy until it was eclipsed by the theories of Copernicus.

Gerard edited for Latin readers the Tables of Toledo, the most accurate compilation of astronomical data ever seen in Europe at the time. The Tables were partly the work of Al-Zarqali, known to the West as Arzachel, a mathematician and astronomer who flourished in Cordoba in the eleventh century.

Al-Farabi, the Islamic "second teacher" after Aristotle, wrote hundreds of treatises. His book on the sciences, Kitab lhsa al Ulum, discussed classification and fundamental principles of science in a unique and useful manner. Gerard rendered it as De scientiis (On the Sciences).

Gerard translated Euclid’s Geometry and Alfraganus's Elements of Astronomy.

Gerard also composed original treatises on algebra, arithmetic and astrology. In the astrology text, longitudes are reckoned both from Cremona and Toledo.

In total, Gerard of Cremona translated 87 books from the Arabic language, including such originally Greek works as Ptolemy's Almagest, Archimedes' On the Measurement of the Circle, Aristotle's On the Heavens, and Euclid's Elements of Geometry; and such originally Arabic works as al-Khwarizmi's On Algebra and Almucabala, Jabir ibn Aflah's Elementa astronomica, and works by al-Razi (Rhazes). Gerard of Cremona was also creator of anatomical terms. The Latin translation of the Calendar of Córdoba, entitled Liber Anoe, has also been attributed to Gerard.

The historian Edward Grant calls Gerard the "greatest of all western translators" and claims that his translations "would have alone drastically altered the course of western science" even if no other translators had been active.

== A second Gerard Cremonensis ==
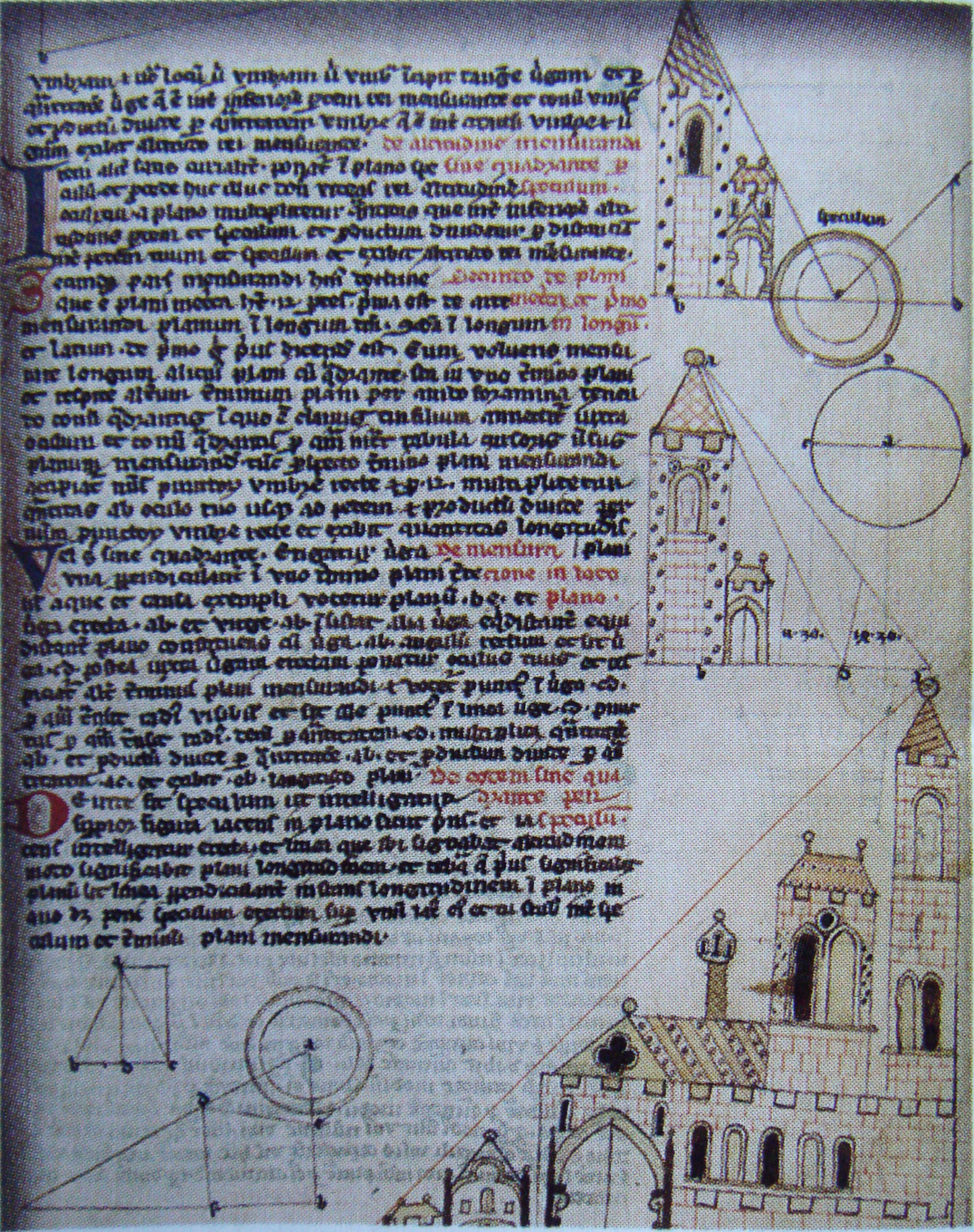
Theorica Planetarum by Gerard of Cremona, 13th century.

Some of the works credited to Gerard of Cremona are probably the work of a later Gerard Cremonensis, working in the thirteenth century, who was also known as Gerard de Sabloneta (Sabbioneta). The later Gerard focused on translating medical texts rather than astronomical texts, but the two translators have understandably been confused with one another. His translations from works of Avicenna are said to have been made by order of the emperor Frederick II.

Other treatises attributed to the "Second Gerard" include the Theoria or Theorica planetarum, and versions of Avicenna’s Canon of Medicine— the basis of the numerous subsequent Latin editions of that well-known work — and of the Almansor of al-Razi ("Rhazes" in Latin-speaking Europe). The attribution of the Theorica to Gerard of Sabbioneta is not well supported by manuscript evidence and should not be regarded as certain.

== See also ==
- Latin translations of the 12th century
