= Ibn Mu'adh al-Jayyani =

Andalusian philosopher and mathematician

Al-Jayyānī
- Born: 989; Iraq
- Died: 1079; Jaén, Al-Andalus

Academic background
- Influences: Euclid, al-Khwarizmi

Academic work
- Era: Islamic Golden Age
- Main interests: Mathematics, Astronomy

Abū ʿAbd Allāh Muḥammad ibn Muʿādh al-Jayyānī (Arabic: أبو عبد الله محمد بن معاذ الجياني; 989, Cordova, Al-Andalus – 1079, Jaén, Al-Andalus) was an Arab mathematician, Islamic scholar, and Qadi from Al-Andalus (in present-day Spain). Al-Jayyānī wrote important commentaries on Euclid's Elements and he wrote the first known treatise on spherical trigonometry.

== Life ==
Little is known about his life. Confusion exists over the identity of al-Jayyānī of the same name mentioned by ibn Bashkuwal (died 1183), Qur'anic scholar, Arabic Philologist, and expert in inheritance laws (farāʾiḍī). It is unknown whether they are the same person. There is some evidence that he lived in Cairo from 1012/13 to 1016/17.

== Works ==
Al-Jayyānī wrote The book of unknown arcs of a sphere, which is considered "the first treatise on spherical trigonometry", although spherical trigonometry in its ancient Hellenistic form was dealt with by earlier mathematicians such as Menelaus of Alexandria, whose treatise the Spherics included Menelaus' theorem, still a basic tool for solving spherical geometry problems in Al-Jayyānī's time. However, E. S. Kennedy points out that while it was possible in pre-Islamic mathematics to compute the magnitudes of a spherical figure, in principle, by use of the table of chords and Menelaus' theorem, the application of the theorem to spherical problems was very difficult in practice. Al-Jayyānī's work on spherical trigonometry "contains formulae for right-handed triangles, the general law of sines, and the solution of a spherical triangle by means of the polar triangle." This treatise later had a "strong influence on European mathematics", and his "definition of ratios as numbers" and "method of solving a spherical triangle when all sides are unknown" are likely to have influenced Regiomontanus.

There is strong consensus in attributing to him the authorship of a manuscript about the duration of twilight, and using that to measure the thickness of the atmosphere. The short treatise On twilight was incorrectly attributed to Ibn al-Haytham for several centuries, due to a reference made by Gerard of Cremona, who translated it into Latin. The first printed edition of Cremona's translation (Allacen arabis uetustissimi liber de crepusculis, Gerardo Cremonensi interprete) was made in 1542, by the Portuguese mathematician and cosmographer Pedro Nunes.

== See also ==
- List of Arab scientists and scholars
- Islamic mathematics
