= Musa ibn Tubi =

Ibn ʿUmran Musa ibn Tubi al-Israʿili Ishbili (Arabic: بن عمران موسى طوبي الإسرائيلي إشبيلي, Hebrew: עמראן מוסי בן טובי אלאסראילי), also known as Moshe ben Toviah (Hebrew: מֹשֶׁה בֵּן טוֹבִיָּה), was a 14th-century Jewish Sevillan Arabic poet. He was the author of a poem in Maghrebi Arabic of didactic character, entitled Al-Sabʿīnīyah. This poem was later translated into Hebrew, under the title Batte ha-Nefesh, by Solomon da Piera (c. 1363). Both the original and the translation were published by Hartwig Hirschfeld in the Annual Report of the Montefiore College (1893–94).
