= Toledan Tables =

Medieval astronomical tables

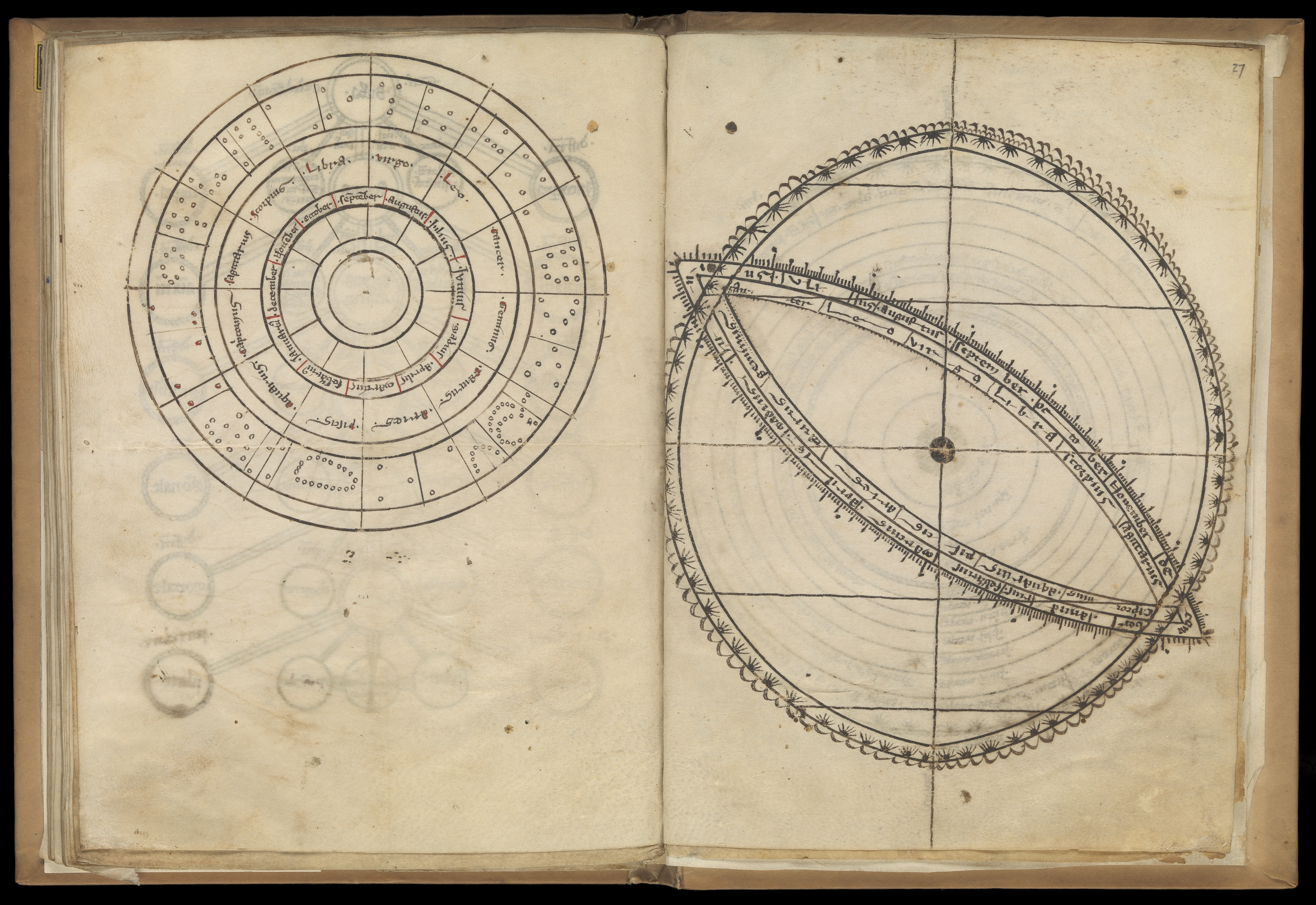
The 'Canones' are a translation of a diagram from the Toledan Tables by Gerardus Cremonensis.

The Toledan Tables, or Tables of Toledo, were astronomical tables which were used to predict the movements of the Sun, Moon and planets relative to the fixed stars. They were a collection of mathematical tables that describe different aspects of the cosmos including prediction of calendar dates, times of cosmic events, and cosmic motion.

== Origins ==
The Toledan Tables were completed around 1080 by a group of Arabic astronomers at Toledo, Spain. They had started as preexisting Arabic tables made elsewhere, and were numerically adjusted to be centered on the location of Toledo. The Tables of Toledo were partly based on the work of al-Zarqali (known to the West as Arzachel), an Arab mathematician, astronomer, astronomy instrument-maker, and astrologer, who lived in Toledo. The tables were produced by a team whose membership is largely unknown, with the exception of al-Zarqali.

Toledo came under Christian Spanish rule in the mid-1080s, shortly after the tables were completed. A century later at Toledo, the Arabic-to-Latin translator Gerard of Cremona (1114–1187) translated for Latin readers the Tables of Toledo, the most accurate compilation in Europe at the time. This collection of tables was influenced heavily by the work of earlier astronomers and tables such as that of Ptolematic tables and the work of al-Battānī. What the Toledan Tables didn't derive from previous texts was their parameters for the mean motion of celestial bodies. These parameters use sidereal co-ordinates which is different than other tables, Ptolemy's are tropical for instance. During the mid-thirteenth century, Campanus of Novara constructed tables for the meridian of Novara from the Toledan tables of al-Zarqali.

The original version of the Arabic Toledan Tables have been lost but there is still over one hundred versions of the Latin translation which were used for a Greek translation of the Toledan Tables, written in Cyprus in the 1330s, likely by the Greek Cypriot scholar George Lapithes.

There are a fair amount of errors in the Toledan Tables' calculations. The Toledan Tables are almost entirely a collection of copies of other tables. Because of this, the many errors and discrepancies are primarily considered to be copy errors.

== Historical Uses ==
The Toledan Tables were updated in the 1270s by the Alfonsine tables, which were produced at Toledo, in Spanish and Latin, from the original tables of two centuries earlier. The descendants of the Toledan Tables, as updated with some corrections, were the most widely used astronomy tables in late medieval Latin astronomy. Although the compilers of the tables assumed the Earth was stationary at the center of the universe, the data in the tables was successfully used by Copernicus in the development of the model in which the Sun is stationary.

The Toledan Tables were used in the work of a man by the name of Isaac ben Joseph Israeli of Toledo. He used a collection of various Toledan Tables along with other sources to provide information on eclipses. These eclipses had been observed by R. Isaac ben Sid, who was known as one of the authors of the Castilian Alfonsine Tables. Because of this, it was thought that Isaac ben Joseph would speak about the Alfonsine Tables, however he makes no mention of these tables, instead he references the Toledan Tables.

An important characteristic of a few of the Toledan Tables is that they listed the arguments of the planetary positions in half-degrees, making these tables twice as long as other tables which dealt in only full degrees. These arguments were specifically found for Saturn, Venus and Mercury. The Toledan Tables were organized into categories such as:

- Chronology of eras
- Trigonometry and spherical astronomy
- Mean motions of the sun, moon, and planets
- Planetary latitudes
- Eclipses
- Astrology

In modern astronomy, tables of movements of astronomical bodies are called ephemerides. These expand upon the ideas of the Toledan tables, and are used with modern computing methods to calculate where any celestial body will be at any point in time in relation to another celestial body. They are updated yearly by NASA to provide the accuracy needed for modern calculations. This expands upon the Alfonsine tables by using an updated analytical solution to the conics of the orbital bodies that more accurately map their orbits.

== See also ==
- Zij (medieval Arabic astronomy tables)
- Alfonsine tables (produced at Toledo, mostly the original Toledan Tables)
- Prutenic Tables (first comprehensive heliocentric tables, year 1551)
- Rudolphine Tables (astronomy tables of Kepler, year 1627)
