= Nur ad-Din al-Bitruji =

12th-century Iberian Arab astronomer and Qadi

- Born: 12th century
- Died: c. 1204

Academic background
- Influences: Avempace, Ibn Tufail, al-Zarqali

Academic work
- Era: Islamic Golden Age
- Main interests: Astronomy
- Notable works: Kitāb al-Hayʾah
- Notable ideas: First non‐Ptolemaic astronomical system; physical cause of celestial motions
- Influenced: Grosseteste, Albertus Magnus, Roger Bacon, Regiomontanus, Copernicus

Nūr al-Dīn ibn Isḥaq al-Biṭrūjī (Arabic: نور الدين ابن إسحاق البطروجي, died c. 1204), known in the West by the Latinized name of Alpetragius, was an Arab astronomer and qadi in al-Andalus. Al-Biṭrūjī was the first astronomer to present the concentric spheres model as an alternative to the Ptolemaic system, with the planets borne by geocentric spheres. Another original aspect of his system was proposing a physical cause of celestial motions. His alternative system spread through most of Europe during the 13th century.

The crater Alpetragius on the Moon is named after him.

== Life ==
Almost nothing about his life is known, except that his name probably derives from Los Pedroches (al-Biṭrawj), a region near Cordoba. He was a disciple of Ibn Tufail (Abubacer) and was a contemporary of Averroes.

== Planetary model ==
Al-Bitruji proposed a theory on planetary motion in which he wished to avoid both epicycles and eccentrics, and to account for the phenomena peculiar to the wandering stars, by compounding rotations of homocentric spheres. This was a modification of the system of planetary motion proposed by his predecessors, Ibn Bajjah (Avempace) and Ibn Tufail (Abubacer). He was unsuccessful in replacing Ptolemy's planetary model, as the numerical predictions of the planetary positions in his configuration were less accurate than those of the Ptolemaic model, because of the difficulty of mapping Ptolemy's epicyclic model onto Aristotle's concentric spheres.

It was suggested based on the Latin translations that his system is an update and reformulation of that of Eudoxus of Cnidus combined with the motion of fixed stars developed by al-Zarqālī. However, it is not known whether the Andalusian cosmologists had access or knowledge of Eudoxus works.

One original aspect of al-Biṭrūjī's system is his proposal of a physical cause of celestial motions. He combines the idea of "impetus" (first proposed by John Philoponus) and the concept of shawq ("desire"), of Abū al‐Barakāt al‐Baghdādī, to explain how energy is transferred from a first mover placed in the 9th sphere to other spheres, explaining the other spheres' variable speeds and different motions. He contradicts the Aristotelian idea that there is a specific kind of dynamics for each world, applying instead the same dynamics to the sublunar and the celestial worlds.

His alternative system spread through most of Europe during the 13th century, with debates and refutations of his ideas continued up to the 16th century. Copernicus cited his system in the De revolutionibus while discussing theories of the order of the inferior planets.

== Works ==
Al-Bitruji wrote Kitāb al-Hayʾah (Arabic: 'كتاب الهيئة, romanized: Book of the Structure), which presented criticism of Ptolemy's Almagest from a physical point of view. It was well known in Europe between the 13th and the 16th centuries and was regarded as a valid alternative to Ptolemy's Almagest in scholastic circles.

This work was translated into Latin by Michael Scot in 1217 as De motibus celorum (first printed in Vienna in 1531). Moses ibn Tibbon translated it into Medieval Hebrew in 1259.

There is also an anonymous treatise on the tides (Escorial MS 1636, dated 1192), which contains material seemingly borrowed from al-Bitruji.
