= List of female Islamic scholars =

This article is an incomplete list of female scholars of Islam. A traditionally-trained female scholar is referred to as ʿālimah or Shaykha. The inclusion of women in university settings has increased the presence of women scholars. Akram Nadwi authored the largest compilation on female Islamic scholars, titled Al-Wafa bi Asma al-Nisa, spanning over two decades and containing a repository of more than 10,000 entries.

== 7th century ==
- Fatima
- Aisha
- Zaynab bint Ali
- Hafsa bint Umar
- Umm al-Darda as-Sughra
- Umm Hakim
- Al-Shifa' bint Abdullah
- Hafsa bint Sirin
- Umm Salama
- A'isha bint Talha
- Umm Kulthum bint Abi Bakr
- Na'ila bint al-Furafisa
- Umm al-Darda
- Sakina bint Husayn

== 8th century ==
- Fatima bint Musa
- Sayyida Nafisa
- Fatima al-Batayahiyyah
- Sumayyah bint Khabbat
- Fatima bint Mundhir
- Rabia Basri
- Atika bint Yazid

== 9th century ==
- Fatima al-Fihriya

== 10th century ==
- Amat al-Wahid
- Lubna of Córdoba

== 11th century ==
- Karima al-Marwaziyya

== 12th century ==
- Fatima al Samaraqandi
- Taqiyya Umm Ali bint Ghaith ibn Ali al-Armanazi
- Fakhr-un-Nisa Shuhdah also known as Shaykhah Shuhdah, or Shuhdah al-Baghdadiyyah

== 13th century ==
- Zaynab bint ʿUmar al-Kindī
- Zaynab bint al-Kamal

== 14th century ==
- Sitt al-Wuzara' al-Tanukhiyyah
- Sitt al-Qudat
- Sitt al-'Arab
- Sitt al-'Ajam

== 16th century ==
- A'isha al-Ba'uniyya

== 17th century ==
- Zeb un-nisa Begum, Mughal princess, contributor to the Hanafi lexicon Fatawa-e-Alamgiri.
- Jahanara Begum

== 18th century ==
- Dada Masiti
- Fatima al-Fudayliya, also known as al-Shaykha al-Fudayliya.

== 19th century ==
- Nana Asma’u bint Shehu Usman bin Fodiyo
- Sultan Shah Jahan, Begum of Bhopal
- Teungku Fakinah

== 20th century ==
- Aisha Abd al-Rahman
- Zainab al Ghazali
- Munira al-Qubaysi
- Margot Badran
- Maryam Jameelah
- Lady Amin
- Hāshimīyah al-Tujjar
- Iftikhār al-Tujjar
- Zīnah al-Sādāt Humāyūnī
- Muhammadi Begum
- Fatima al-Kabbaj
- Du Shuzhen
- Eva de Vitray-Meyerovitch
- Amina al-Sadr
- Rahmah el Yunusiyah

== 21st century ==
- Asifa Quraishi
- Asma Afsaruddin
- Azizah al-Hibri
- Celene Ibrahim
- Farhat Hashmi
- Ingrid Mattson
- Laleh Bakhtiar
- Maria Ulfah
- Merryl Wyn Davies
- Riffat Hassan
- Siti Chamamah Soeratno
- Siti Noordjannah Djohantini
- Zailan Moris
- Siti Musdah Mulia
- Asma Lamrabet
- Maria Massi Dakake
- Sachiko Murata
- Amina Wadud
- Hidayet Şefkatli Tuksal
- Fatima Mernissi
- Nahid Angha
- Aisha Bewley
- Amina Inloes
- Zohreh Sefati
- Tahera Qutbuddin
- Mohja Kahf
- Asma Barlas
- Mai Yamani
- Ziba Mir-Hosseini
- Gwendolyn Zoharah Simmons
- Halima Krausen
- Aminah McCloud
- Kecia Ali
- Mona Abul-Fadl
- Nadia Amara
- Cemalnur Sargut
- Claude Addas
- Marcia Hermansen
- Sa'diyya Shaikh
- Zainab Alwani
- Salwa El-Awa
- Rebecca Masterton
- Tahereh Saffarzadeh
- Olfa Youssef
- Bahar Davary
- Rania Awaad
- Abla al-Kahlawi
- Aisha Gray Henry
- Aysha Hidayatullah
- Debra Majeed
- Suad Salih
- Aisha Lemu
- Tuba Isik
- ʻUzayyah ʻAlī Ṭāhā
