= Mixed-sex education =

System of education where female and male students are educated together

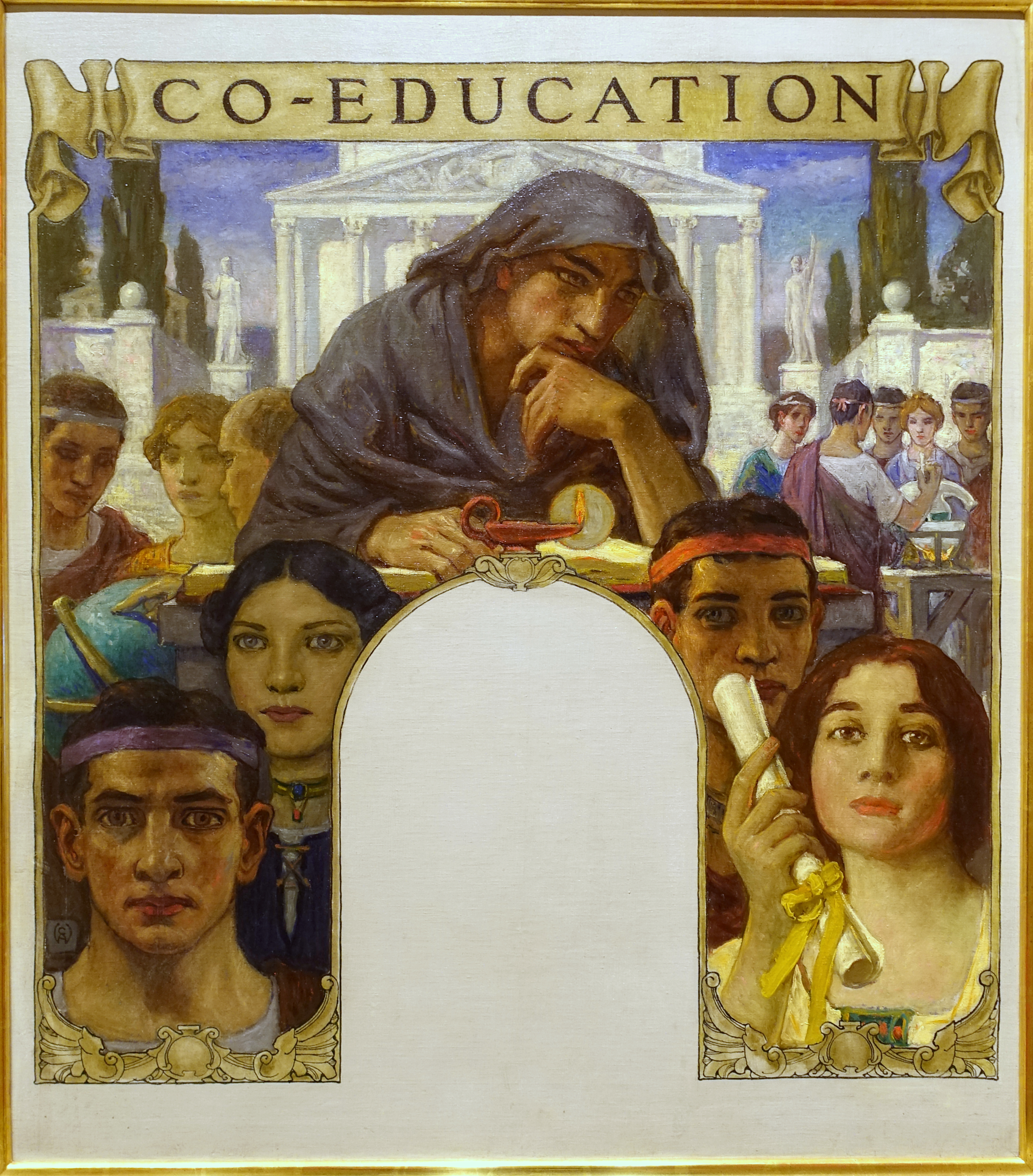
Co-Education by Charles Allan Winter, c. 1915

Mixed-sex education, also known as mixed-gender education, co-education, or coeducation (abbreviated to co-ed or coed), is a system of education where female and male students are educated together. Whereas single-sex education was more common up to the 19th century, mixed-sex education has since become standard in many cultures, particularly in Western countries. Single-sex education remains prevalent in many Muslim countries. The relative merits of both systems have been the subject of debate.

The world's oldest co-educational school is thought to be Archbishop Tenison's Church of England High School, Croydon, established in 1714 in the United Kingdom, which admitted boys and girls from its opening onwards. This has always been a day school only.

The world's oldest co-educational both day and boarding school is Dollar Academy, a junior and senior school for female and male students from ages 5 to 18 in Scotland, United Kingdom. From its opening in 1818, the school admitted both boys and girls of the parish of Dollar and the surrounding area. The school continues in existence to the present day with around 1,250 pupils.

The first co-educational college to be founded was Oberlin Collegiate Institute in Oberlin, Ohio. It opened on 3 December 1833, with 44 students, including 29 men and 15 women. Fully equal status for women did not arrive until 1837, and the first three women to graduate with bachelor's degrees did so in 1840. By the late 20th century, many institutions of higher learning that had been exclusively for men or women had become coeducational.

== History ==
In early civilizations, people were typically educated informally: primarily within the household. As time progressed, education became more structured and formal. Women often had very few rights when education started to become a more important aspect of civilization. Efforts of the ancient Greek and Chinese societies focused primarily on the education of boys and men. In ancient Rome, the availability of education was gradually extended to women, but they were taught separately from men. The early Christians and medieval Europeans continued this trend, and single-sex schools for the privileged classes prevailed through the Reformation period. The early periods of this century included many religious schools and the first major public schools in the country had been established for female and male students.

In sharp contrast, in the Muslim world, women played prominent roles in education from the beginning of Islamic history. The wife of Muhammad, Aisha, turned her home into a center of learning where both genders flocked to for classes. Umm al-Darda in the 7th century used to study in both men's and women's circles and then became a prominent teacher herself, even teaching at the Dome of the Rock in Jerusalem, and the caliph Abd al-Malik ibn Marwan was her student. Many prominent historic Muslim jurists were educated by female scholars, including the famed imam Al-Shafi'i by Sayyida Nafisa. The book Al-Wafa bi Asma al-Nisa is devoted to female hadith scholars alone, and covers over 10,000 women in Islamic history. The various halaqas in the Muslim world through the centuries were often open to both genders, and their stories are visible in numerous historic records. Two examples are Shaykhah Umm Al-Khayr Fatimah bint Ibrahim and her contemporary Sitt Al-Wuzara who taught both men and women in prominent mosques in the 14th century CE. However, as the centuries passed, an interesting phenomenon is observed--the slowly diminishing role of women in education as the empires spread and absorbed non-Muslim cultures, such as the Byzantines and Sassanians and more, whose pre-Islamic cultures had a long history of patriarchy and were sometimes reticent to adjust to the new Islamic norms. Nonetheless, women's roles in education were, still yet, incomparably pronounced compared to any other premodern civilization in human history by a massive margin.

In the 16th century, at the Council of Trent, the Roman Catholic church reinforced the establishment of free elementary schools for children of all classes. The concept of universal elementary education, regardless of sex, had been created. After the Reformation, coeducation was introduced in Western Europe, when certain Protestant groups urged that boys and girls should be taught to read the Bible. The practice became very popular in northern England, Scotland, and colonial New England, where young children, both male and female, attended dame schools. In the late 18th century, girls gradually were admitted to town schools. The Society of Friends in England, as well as in the United States, pioneered coeducation as they did universal education, and in Quaker settlements in the British colonies, boys and girls commonly attended school together. The new free public elementary, or common schools, which after the American Revolution supplanted church institutions, were almost always coeducational, and by 1900 most public high schools were coeducational as well. In the late 19th and early 20th centuries, coeducation grew much more widely accepted. In Great Britain, Germany, and the Soviet Union, the education of boys and girls in the same classes became an approved practice.

== Australia ==
In Australia, there is a trend towards increased coeducational schooling with new coeducational schools opening, few new single-sex schools opening and existing single-sex schools combining or opening their doors to the opposite gender.

== China ==
The first mixed-sex institution of higher learning in China was the Nanjing Higher Normal Institute, which was renamed National Central University and Nanjing University. For millennia in China, public schools, especially public higher learning schools, were for men. Generally, only schools established by zōng zú (宗族, gens) were for both female and male students. Some schools, such as Li Zhi's school during the Ming dynasty and Yuan Mei's school during the Qing Dynasty, enrolled both female and male students. In the 1910s, women's universities were established, such as Ginling Women's University and Peking Girls' Higher Normal School, but there was no coeducation in higher learning schools.

Tao Xingzhi, the Chinese advocator of mixed-sex education, proposed The Audit Law for Women Students (規定女子旁聽法案, Guīdìng Nǚzǐ Pángtīng Fǎ’àn) at the meeting of Nanjing Higher Normal School held on 7 December 1919. He also proposed that the university recruit female students. The idea was supported by the president Kuo Ping-Wen, academic director Liu Boming, and such famous professors as Lu Zhiwei and Yang Xingfo, but opposed by many famous men of the time. The meeting passed the law and decided to recruit women students next year. Nanjing Higher Normal School enrolled eight Chinese female students in 1920. In the same year Peking University also began to allow women students to audit classes. One of the most notable female students of that time was Chien-Shiung Wu.

In 1949, the People's Republic of China was founded. The Chinese government pursued a policy of moving towards co-education and nearly all schools and universities have become mixed-sex. In recent years, some female or single-sex schools have again emerged for special vocational training needs, but equal rights for education still applies to all citizens.

Indigenous Muslim populations in China, the Hui and Salars, find coeducation to be controversial, owing to Islamic ideas on gender roles. On the other hand, the Muslim Uyghurs have not historically objected to coeducation.

== France ==
Admission to the Sorbonne was opened to women in 1860. The baccalauréat became gender-blind in 1924, giving equal chances to all girls in applying to any universities. Mixed-sex education became mandatory for primary schools in 1957 and for all universities in 1975.

== Hong Kong ==
St. Paul's Co-educational College was the first mixed-sex secondary school in Hong Kong. It was founded in 1915 as St. Paul's Girls' College. At the end of World War II, it was temporarily merged with St. Paul's College, which is a boys' school. When classes at the campus of St. Paul's College were resumed, it continued to be mixed and changed to its present name. Some other renowned mixed-sex secondary schools in town include Hong Kong Pui Ching Middle School, Queen Elizabeth School, and Tsuen Wan Government Secondary School. Most Hong Kong primary and secondary schools are mixed-sex, including government public schools, charter schools, and private schools.

== Mongolia ==
Mongolia's first co-educational school, named Third School, opened in Ulaanbaatar on November 2, 1921. Subsequent schools have been co-educational and there are no longer any single-sex schools in Mongolia.

== Pakistan ==
Pakistan is one of the many Muslim countries where most schools and colleges are single-gender although some schools and colleges, and most universities are coeducational. In schools that offer O levels and A levels, co-education is quite prevalent. After the independence of Pakistan in 1947, most universities were coeducational but the proportion of women was less than 5%. After the Islamization policies in the early 1980s, the government established Women's colleges and Women's universities to promote education among women who were hesitant to study in a mixed-sex environment. Today, however, most universities and a large number of schools in urban areas are co-educational.

== United Kingdom ==
=== Schools ===
In the United Kingdom the official term is mixed, and today most schools are mixed. A number of Quaker co-educational boarding schools were established before the 19th century.

The world's oldest co-educational school is thought to be Archbishop Tenison's Church of England High School, Croydon, established in 1714 in the United Kingdom, which admitted 10 boys and 10 girls from its opening, and remained co-educational thereafter. This is a day school only and still in existence.

The Scottish Dollar Academy was the first mixed-sex both day and boarding school in the UK. Founded in 1818, it is the oldest both boarding and day mixed-sex educational institution in the world still in existence. In England, the first non-Quaker mixed-sex public boarding school was Bedales School, founded in 1893 by John Haden Badley and becoming mixed in 1898. The first non-denominational co-educational day school in England was The King Alfred School, in North West London, which was officially opened by Millicent Garrett Fawcett on 24 June 1898. Ruckleigh School in Solihull was founded by Cathleen Cartland in 1909 as a non-denominational co-educational preparatory school many decades before others followed. Many previously single-sex schools have begun to accept both sexes in the past few decades: for example, Clifton College began to accept girls in 1987.

=== Higher-education institutions ===
In 1869, the Edinburgh Seven became the first women to be admitted as undergraduates to a British university. However, they were not allowed to attend the same lectures as men and were eventually barred from receiving degrees.

The first higher-education institution in the United Kingdom to enrol men and women on equal terms was the University of Bristol (then University College, Bristol) in 1876. The University of London was the first British university to admit women to degrees alongside men, in 1878, but was an examining board rather than a teaching institution at that time. The federal Victoria University was established in 1880 and was authorised to grant degrees to men and women, and from 1883 Owens College (then the only college of the university; now the University of Manchester) admitted women. Durham University College of Science (now Newcastle University) had allowed women to study alongside men from its foundation in 1871, but the first women did not enrol until 1880. Women at Durham could take the Associate in Science at this time, but were not permitted to take full degrees until 1895 and could not become members of convocation until 1913. The Scottish universities were opened to women by the Universities (Scotland) Act 1889, with the first women being admitted in 1892, although women remained barred from studying medicine until 1916. At Oxford, women were admitted to membership of the university and to degrees from 1920, while at Cambridge this did not occur until 1948. Women at Cambridge continued to have to take examinations in different rooms from the men until 1956.

Accommodation at universities became mixed much later than education, starting in the 1960s with the plate glass universities. At Sussex (1961), the halls of residence were single sex, while the halls at Essex (1965) were mixed but with floors segregated by sex. At the first Lancaster colleges, Bowland and Lonsdale (1964), floors were mixed but segregated by area, while in Lancaster's third college, Cartmel (1968), segregation was only by corridor.

Given their dual role as both residential and educational establishments, and that most undergraduate students were not legally adults until the 1970s, individual colleges at Oxford, Cambridge and Durham remained segregated for longer than their parent universities. The first to become mixed were post-graduate colleges and societies, whose students were legally adults, starting with Oxford's Nuffield College from its establishment in 1937. The first mixed Cambridge college was the post-graduate Darwin from its foundation in 1964; similarly, Durham's Graduate Society (now Ustinov College) was mixed from its opening in 1965. Until 1970, students under 21 were not legally adults and universities and colleges acted in loco parentis. After the age of majority was reduced to 18 in 1970, restrictions on mixed student residences began to be lifted. In 1972, Churchill, Clare, and King's colleges became the first previously all-male Cambridge colleges to admit female undergraduates, while the first mixed undergraduate colleges at Durham, also in 1972, were Collingwood College, which was founded that year and was also the first British university residence to have mixed-sex corridors, and the originally all-male Van Mildert College. The first five undergraduate colleges at Oxford (Brasenose, Hertford, Jesus, St Catherine's, and Wadham) became mixed in 1974. The last all-male colleges became mixed in 1988, including Magdalene College, Cambridge, Hatfield College, Durham and St Chad's College, Durham; the last all-male colleges at Oxford having become mixed in 1986. St Benet's Hall (now closed), a permanent private hall rather than a college, was the last institution at Oxford to become mixed, admitting postgraduate women from 2014 and undergraduates from 2016.

The last women's college in Durham, St Mary's, became mixed in 2005. At Oxford, the last women's college, St Hilda's, became mixed in 2008. As of 2025, two colleges remain single-sex (women-only) at Cambridge: Murray Edwards (New Hall) and Newnham. Single-sex women's accommodation continues the be available at some other universities, including Aberdare Hall at Cardiff, and the Boughton Wing of St Mary's College, Durham.

== Canada ==
During the late 19th and 20th centuries, women were progressively accepted into higher education programs at Canadian universities. Although a few institutions had already accepted a few women, the 1880s marked an important time when co-education began to flourish. This was seen when Acadia University first admitted women in 1880, Dalhousie University in 1881, and the University of Toronto in 1884. McGill University followed in 1884, however they initially maintained separate educational arrangements. Over the next few decades, more universities followed, although each had different admission procedures and program structures.

The introduction of co-education in Canada didn’t immediately mean that female students experienced equal treatment. Originally, Canadian universities were structured on men’s education alongside their career opportunities. When women were integrated into these programs their presence questioned established stereotypes about women’s intellectual capacity and societal obligations. For example, when the University of Toronto began accepting women during 1884-1895, the school raised discussions regarding their place in a higher education system. Furthermore, opposition was largely rooted in the belief that women should maintain traditional roles rather than pursue the same education and career opportunities as men.

Women’s experiences also differed from those of men based on the university and the opportunities available within it. In 1881, Dalhousie University had two female students, however, in 1921 this number increased to 166. During this time, women were allowed to pursue careers in business, medicine, law, and dentistry. Although women continued to encounter societal expectations and limitations, their growing participation demonstrated the increasing opportunities available through co-education.

Next, questions about women’s independence and power within universities gained more attention following the First World War. In 1919, female students at the University of Toronto joined together to protest the dean of residence’s expanding power over student accommodation. This protest, described in The Varsity as an “Insurrection of the Women” represented demands for democratic student government and increased independence. Instead of encouraging equal participation, school administrators viewed student government as a way to prepare women for their anticipated roles in society.

Additionally, women’s access to higher education differed across institutions and regions. Geographical location, religion, and societal expectations all influenced this decision. Furthermore, much of the historical research focuses on white, middle-class women, leaving the experiences of Indigenous women and women from other racial or social backgrounds less explored.

Ultimately, by the 1920s, many Canadian universities had established co-education. However, independence, equal academic opportunities, and influence within educational institutions weren’t always granted to women who were admitted.

== United States ==
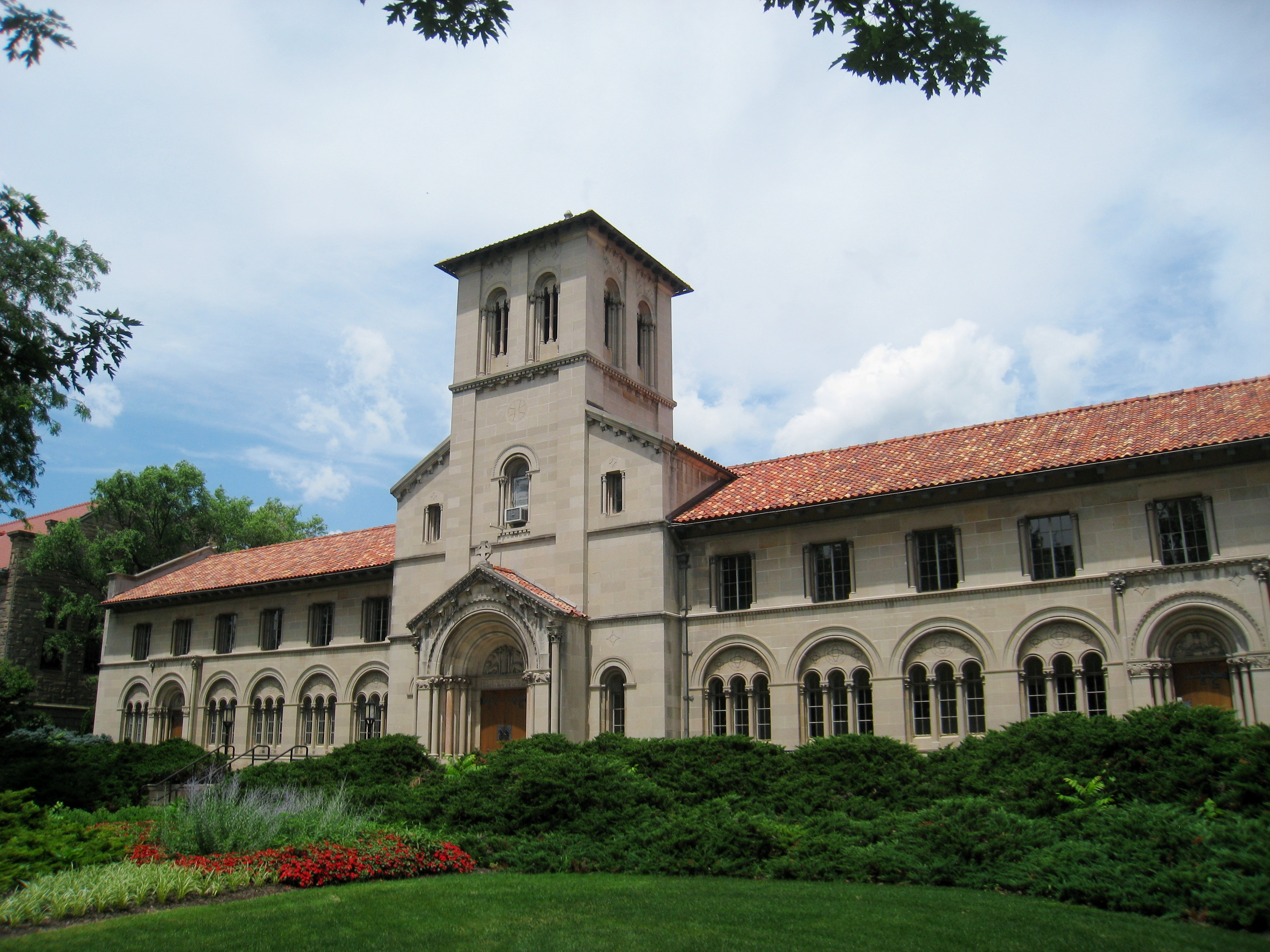
Oberlin College, the oldest extant mixed-sex institute of higher education in the United States

The oldest extant mixed-sex institute of higher education in the United States is Oberlin College in Oberlin, Ohio, which was established in 1833. Mixed-sex classes were admitted to the preparatory department at Oberlin in 1833 and the college department in 1837. The first four women to receive bachelor's degrees in the United States earned them at Oberlin in 1841. Later, in 1862, the first black woman to receive a bachelor's degree (Mary Jane Patterson) also earned it from Oberlin College. Beginning in 1844, Hillsdale College became the next college to admit mixed-sex classes to four-year degree programs.

The University of Iowa became the first coeducational public or state university in the United States in 1855, and for much of the next century, public universities, and land grant universities in particular, would lead the way in mixed-sex higher education. There were also many private coeducational universities founded in the 19th century, especially west of the Mississippi River. East of the Mississippi, Wheaton College (Illinois) graduated its first female student in 1862. Bates College in Maine was open to women from its founding in 1855, and graduated its first female student in 1869. Cornell University and the University of Michigan each admitted their first female students in 1870.

Around the same time, single-sex women's colleges were also appearing. According to Irene Harwarth, Mindi Maline, and Elizabeth DeBra: "women's colleges were founded during the mid- and late-19th century in response to a need for advanced education for women at a time when they were not admitted to most institutions of higher education." Notable examples include the Seven Sisters colleges, of which Vassar College is now coeducational and Radcliffe College has merged with Harvard University. Other notable women's colleges that have become coeducational include Wheaton College in Massachusetts, Ohio Wesleyan Female College in Ohio, Skidmore College, Wells College, and Sarah Lawrence College in New York state, Pitzer College in California, Goucher College in Maryland and Connecticut College.

By 1900 the Briton Frederic Harrison said after visiting the United States that "The whole educational machinery of America ... open to women must be at least twentyfold greater than with us, and it is rapidly advancing to meet that of men both in numbers and quality". Where most of the history of coeducation in this period is a list of those moving toward the accommodation of both men and women at one campus, the state of Florida was an exception. In 1905, the Buckman Act was one of consolidation in governance and funding but separation in race and gender, with Florida State College for Women (since 1947, Florida State University) established to serve white female students during this era, the campus that became what is now the University of Florida serving white male students, and coeducation stipulated only for the campus serving black students at the site of what is now Florida A&M University. Florida did not return to coeducation at UF and FSU until after World War II, prompted by the drastically increased demands placed on the higher education system by veterans studying via GI Bill programs following World War II. The Buckman arrangements officially ended with new legislation guidelines passed in 1947.

=== Primary and secondary schools ===
Several early primary and secondary schools in the United States were single-sex. Examples include Collegiate School, a boys' school operating in New York by 1638 (which remains a single-sex institution); and Boston Latin School, founded in 1635 (which did not become coeducational until 1972).

Nonetheless, mixed-sex education existed at the lower levels in the U.S. long before it extended to colleges. For example, in 1787, the predecessor to Franklin & Marshall College in Lancaster, Pennsylvania, opened as a mixed-sex secondary school. Its first enrollment class consisted of 36 female and 78 male students. Among the latter was Rebecca Gratz who would become an educator and philanthropist. However, the school soon began having financial problems and it reopened as an all-male institution. Westford Academy in Westford, Massachusetts has operated as mixed-sex secondary school since its founding in 1792, making it the oldest continuously operating coed school in America. The oldest continuously operating coed boarding school in the United States is Westtown School, founded in 1799.

=== Colleges ===
A minister and a missionary founded Oberlin in 1833. Rev. John Jay Shipherd (minister) and Philo P. Stewart (missionary) became friends while spending the summer of 1832 together in nearby Elyria. They discovered a mutual disenchantment with what they saw as the lack of strong Christian principles among the settlers of the American West. They decided to establish a college and a colony based on their religious beliefs, "where they would train teachers and other Christian leaders for the boundless most desolate fields in the West".

Oberlin College and the surrounding community were dedicated to progressive causes and social justice. Though it did reluctantly what every other college refused to do at all, it was the first college to admit both women and African Americans as students. Women were not admitted to the baccalaureate program, which granted bachelor's degrees, until 1837; prior to that, they received diplomas from what was called the Ladies' Course. The initial 1837 students were Caroline Mary Rudd, Elizabeth Prall, Mary Hosford, and Mary Fletcher Kellogg.

The early success and achievement of women at Oberlin College persuaded many early women's rights leaders that coeducation would soon be accepted throughout the country. However, for quite a while, women sometimes were treated rudely by their male classmates. The prejudice of some male professors proved more unsettling. Many professors disapproved of the admission of women into their classes, citing studies that claimed that women were mentally unsuited for higher education, and because most would "just get married", they were using resources that, they believed, male students would use better. Some professors simply ignored the women students.

By the end of the 19th century 70% of American colleges were coeducational, although the state of Florida was a notable exception; the Buckman Act of 1905 imposed gender-separated white higher education at the University of Florida (men) and Florida State College for Women. (As there was only one state college for black students, the future Florida A&M University, it admitted both men and women.) The white Florida campuses returned to coeducation in 1947, when the women's college became Florida State University and the University of Florida became coeducational. In the late 20th century, many institutions of higher learning that had been exclusively for people of one sex became coeducational.

=== Co-education fraternities ===
A number of Greek-letter student societies have either been established (locally or nationally) or expanded as co-ed fraternities.

=== "Coed" as slang ===
In American colloquial language, "coed" or "co-ed" is used to refer to a mixed school. The word is also often used to describe a situation in which both sexes are integrated in any form (e.g., "The team is coed"). Less common in the 21st century is the noun use of word "coed", which traditionally referred to a female student in a mixed gender school. The noun use is considered by many to be sexist and unprofessional, the argument being that applying the term solely to women implies that "normal" education is exclusively male: technically both female and male students at a coeducational institution should be considered "coeds". Writing for the Association for Supervision and Curriculum Development in 2017, author and educator Barbara Boroson described the noun use as "unfortunate", observing that "Although coeducation means 'the education of both sexes together at the same time,' women were considered to be the physical manifestations of the coeducation movement. While men were called students, women were called coeds. The message was that women . . . were not really students." Numerous professional organizations require that the gender-neutral term "student" be used instead of "coed" or, when gender is relevant to the context, that the term "female student" be substituted.

== Effects ==
If the sexes were educated together, we should have the healthy, moral and intellectual stimulus of sex ever quickening and refining all the faculties, without the undue excitement of senses that results from novelty in the present system of isolation.

— Elizabeth Cady Stanton

For years, a question many educators, parents, and researchers have been asking is whether it is academically beneficial to teach boys and girls together or separately at school. Some argue that coeducation has primarily social benefits by allowing female and male students of all ages to become more prepared for real-world situations and that students familiar with a single-sex setting could be less prepared, nervous, or uneasy.

However, some argue that at certain ages, students may be more distracted by the opposite sex in a coeducational setting, but others point to this being based on an assumption that all students are heterosexual. There is evidence that girls may perform less well in traditionally male-dominated subjects such as the sciences when in a class with boys, but other research suggests that when the previous attainment is taken into account, that difference falls away. According to advocates of coeducation, without classmates of the opposite sex, students have social issues that may impact adolescent development. They argue that the absence of the opposite sex creates an unrealistic environment not duplicated in the real world. Some studies show that in classes that are separated by gender, female and male students work and learn on the same level as their peers, the stereotypical mentality of the teacher is removed, and girls are likely to have more confidence in the classroom than they would in a coeducational class. In a 2022 study published in the British Educational Research Journal which examined the Irish educational system, the authors stated that the existing "empirical evidence is somewhat ambiguous, with some studies finding a positive impact of single-sex schooling on education achievement [...] but others finding average null effects"; they concluded that after controlling for "individual, parental and school-level factors [...] on average, there is no significant difference in performance for boys or girls who attend single-sex schools compared to their mixed-school peers in science, mathematics or reading."

== Discussions in the Muslim world ==
The Muslim world has the most pronounced premodern history of coeducation in the world. Both coeducation and gender segregated education were prevalent throughout Islamic history in every century. Many Islamic schools and traditional madrasas have coeducational environments, but the genders are separated by a curtain.

== See also ==
- Co-educational boarding schools
- Heterosociality
- List of women's colleges
- Men's colleges
- Mixed-sex sports
- Single-sex education
- Unisex public toilet
- Women's colleges
- Education of girls in France
