= Siege of Constantinople (674–678) =

Major conflict of the Arab–Byzantine wars

Coordinates: 41.0122°N 28.9760°E

First Arab siege of Constantinople
- Part of the Arab–Byzantine wars
- Constantinople and its surroundings during the Byzantine period
Date	674–678 (disputed, see below)
Location	Constantinople, Sea of Marmara (modern-day Istanbul, Turkey)
Result	Byzantine victory

Belligerents
Umayyad Caliphate	Byzantine Empire

Commanders and leaders
Mu'awiya I; Yazid ibn Mu'awiya; Sufyan ibn Awf †; Fadala ibn Ubayd; Junada ibn Abi Umayya; Abdallah ibn Qais; Abu Ayyub al-Ansari #	Constantine IV

Casualties and losses
c. 25,000 killed	c. 17,000 killed

Constantinople was besieged by the Arabs in 674–678, in what was the first culmination of the Umayyad Caliphate's expansionist strategy against the Byzantine Empire. Caliph Mu'awiya I, who had emerged in 661 as the ruler of the Muslim Arab empire following a civil war, renewed aggressive warfare against Byzantium after a lapse of some years and hoped to deliver a lethal blow by capturing the Byzantine capital of Constantinople.

As reported by the Byzantine chronicler Theophanes the Confessor, the Arab attack was methodical: in 672–673 Arab fleets secured bases along the coasts of Asia Minor and then installed a loose blockade around Constantinople. They used the peninsula of Cyzicus near the city as a base to spend the winter and returned every spring to launch attacks against the city's fortifications. Finally the Byzantines, under Emperor Constantine IV, destroyed the Arab navy using a new invention, the liquid incendiary substance known as Greek fire. The Byzantines also defeated the Arab land army in Asia Minor, forcing them to lift the siege. The Byzantine victory was of major importance for the survival of the Byzantine state, as the Arab threat receded for a time. A peace treaty was signed soon after, and following the outbreak of another Muslim civil war, the Byzantines even experienced a brief period of ascendancy over the Caliphate. The siege was arguably the first major Arab defeat in 50 years of expansion and temporarily stabilized the Byzantine Empire after decades of war and defeats.

The siege left several traces in the legends of the nascent Muslim world, although it is conflated with accounts of another expedition against the city in 669, led by Mu'awiya's son, the future ruler Yazid. As a result, the veracity of Theophanes's account was questioned in 2010 by Oxford scholar James Howard-Johnston, and more recently by Marek Jankowiak. Their analyses have placed more emphasis on the Arabic and Syriac sources, but have drawn different conclusions about the dating and existence of the siege. News of a large-scale siege of Constantinople and a subsequent peace treaty reached China, where they were recorded in later histories of the Tang dynasty.

== Background ==
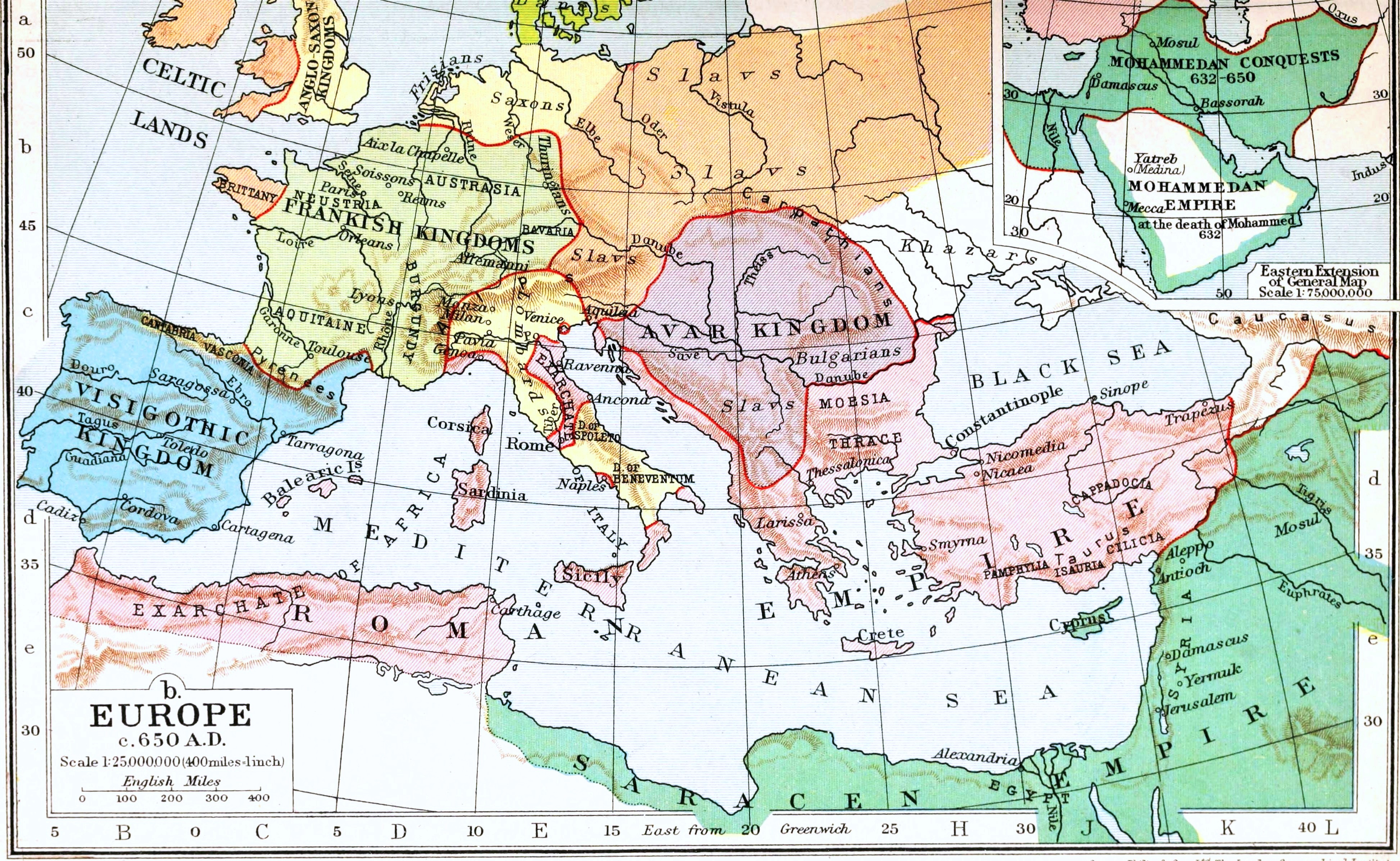
Europe, the Byzantine Empire and the Umayyad empire c. 650

Following the disastrous Battle of the Yarmuk in 636, the Byzantine Empire withdrew the bulk of its remaining forces from the Levant into Asia Minor, which was shielded from the Muslim expansion by the Taurus Mountains. This left the field open for the warriors of the nascent Rashidun Caliphate to complete their conquest of Syria, with Egypt too falling shortly after. Muslim raids against the Cilician frontier zone and deep into Asia Minor began as early as 640, and continued under Mu'awiya, then governor of the Levant. Mu'awiya also spearheaded the development of a Muslim navy, which within a few years grew sufficiently strong to occupy Cyprus and raid as far as Kos, Rhodes and Crete in the Aegean Sea. Finally, the young Muslim navy scored a crushing victory over its Byzantine counterpart in the Battle of the Masts in 655. Following the assassination of Caliph Uthman and the outbreak of the First Muslim Civil War, Arab attacks against Byzantium stopped. In 659, Mu'awiya even concluded a truce with Byzantium, including payment of tribute to the Empire.

The peace lasted until the end of the Muslim civil war in 661, from which Mu'awiya and his clan emerged victorious, establishing the Umayyad Caliphate. From the next year, Muslim attacks recommenced, with pressure mounting as Muslim armies began wintering on Byzantine soil west of the Taurus range, maximizing the disruption caused to the Byzantine economy. These land expeditions were sometimes coupled with naval raids against the coasts of southern Asia Minor. In 668, the Arabs sent aid to Saborios, strategos of the Armeniac Theme, who had rebelled and proclaimed himself emperor. The Arab troops under Fadala ibn Ubayd arrived too late to assist Saborios, who had died after falling from his horse, and they spent the winter in the Hexapolis around Melitene awaiting reinforcements.

In early 669, after receiving additional troops, Fadala entered Asia Minor and advanced as far as Chalcedon, on the Asian shore of the Bosporus across from the Byzantine capital, Constantinople. The Arab attacks on Chalcedon were repelled, and the Arab army was decimated by famine and disease. Mu'awiya dispatched another army, led by his son (and future Caliph) Yazid, to Fadala's aid. Accounts of what followed differ. The Byzantine chronicler Theophanes the Confessor reports that the Arabs remained before Chalcedon for a while before returning to Syria, and that on their way they captured and garrisoned Amorium. This was the first time the Arabs tried to hold a captured fortress in the interior of Asia Minor beyond the campaigning season, and probably meant that the Arabs intended to return next year and use the town as their base, but Amorium was retaken by the Byzantines during the subsequent winter. Arab sources on the other hand report that the Muslims crossed over into Europe and launched an unsuccessful attack on Constantinople itself, before returning to Syria. Given the lack of any mention of such an assault in Byzantine sources, it is most probable that the Arab chroniclers—taking account of Yazid's presence and the fact that Chalcedon is a suburb of Constantinople—"upgraded" the attack on Chalcedon to an attack on the Byzantine capital itself.

== Opening moves: the campaigns of 672 and 673 ==
The campaign of 669 clearly demonstrated to the Arabs the possibility of a direct strike at Constantinople, as well as the necessity of having a supply base in the region. This was found in the peninsula of Cyzicus on the southern shore of the Sea of Marmara, where a raiding fleet under Fadala ibn Ubayd wintered in 670 or 671. Mu'awiya now began preparing his final assault on the Byzantine capital. In contrast to Yazid's expedition, Mu'awiya intended to take a coastal route to Constantinople. The undertaking followed a careful, phased approach: first the Muslims had to secure strongpoints and bases along the coast, and then, with Cyzicus as a base, Constantinople would be blockaded by land and sea and cut off from the agrarian hinterland that supplied its food.

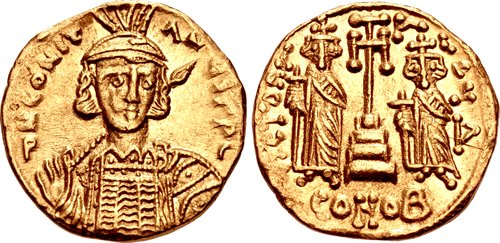
Gold nomisma of Constantine IV

Accordingly, in 672 three great Muslim fleets were dispatched to secure the sea lanes and establish bases between Syria and the Aegean. Muhammad ibn Abdallah's fleet wintered at Smyrna, a fleet under a certain Qays (perhaps Abdallah ibn Qais) wintered in Lycia and Cilicia, and a third fleet, under Khalid, joined them later. According to the report of Theophanes, the Emperor Constantine IV (r. 661–685), upon learning of the Arab fleets' approach, began equipping his own fleet for war. Constantine's armament included siphon-bearing ships intended for the deployment of a newly developed incendiary substance, Greek fire. In 673, another Arab fleet, under Junada ibn Abi Umayya, captured Tarsus in Cilicia, as well as Rhodes. The latter, midway between Syria and Constantinople, was converted into a forward supply base and centre for Muslim naval raids. Its garrison of 12,000 men was regularly rotated back to Syria, a small fleet was attached to it for defence and raiding, and the Arabs even sowed wheat and brought along animals to graze on the island. The Byzantines attempted to obstruct the Arab plans with a naval attack on Egypt, but it was unsuccessful. Throughout this period, overland raids into Asia Minor continued, and the Arab troops wintered on Byzantine soil.

== Arab attacks and related expeditions in 674–678 ==
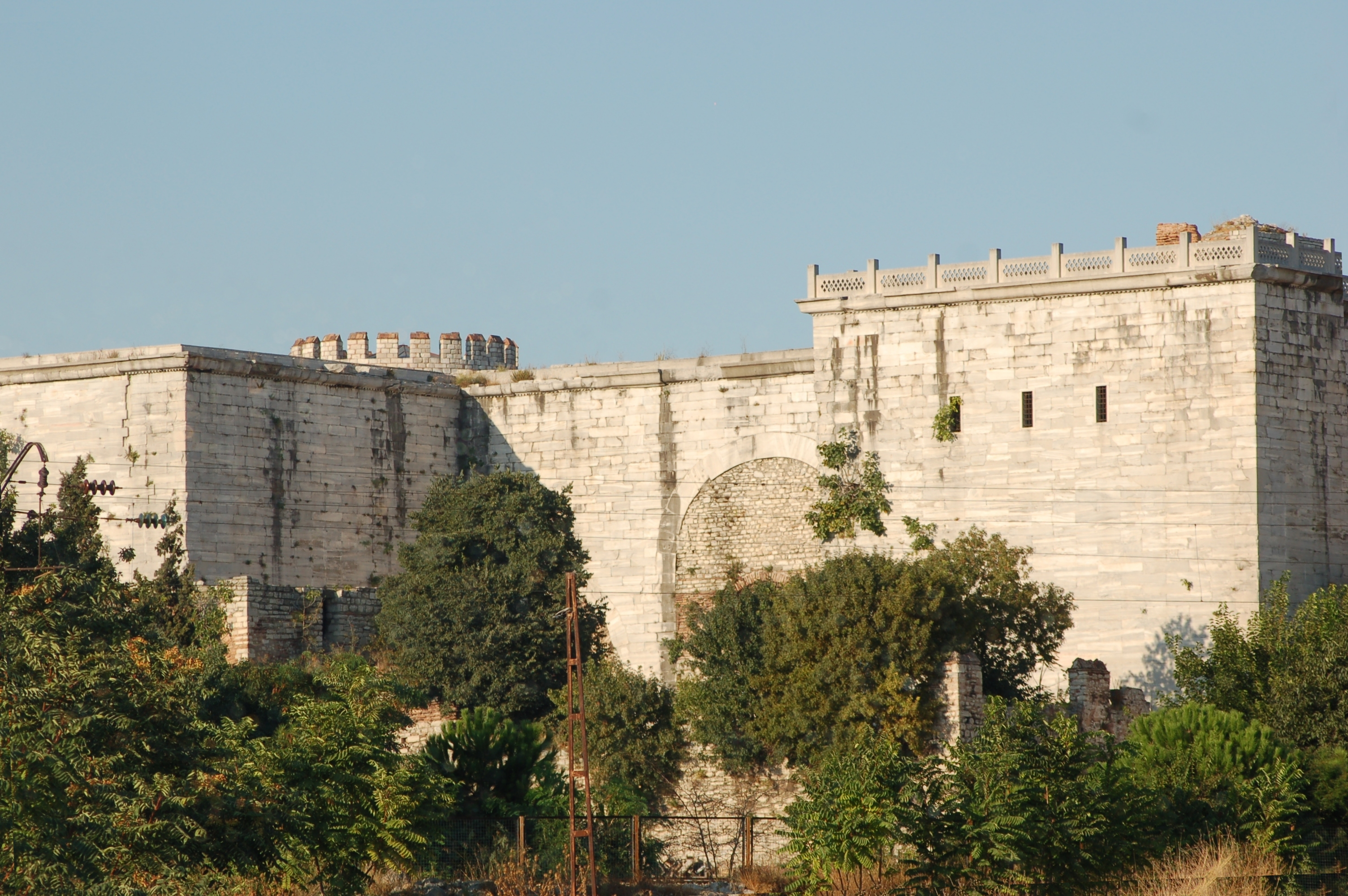
The Golden Gate of the Theodosian Walls of Constantinople

In 674, the Arab fleet sailed from its bases in the eastern Aegean and entered the Sea of Marmara. According to the account of Theophanes, they landed on the Thracian shore near Hebdomon in April, and until September were engaged in constant clashes with the Byzantine troops. As the Byzantine chronicler reports, "Every day there was a military engagement from morning until evening, between the outworks of the Golden Gate and the Kyklobion, with thrust and counter-thrust". Then the Arabs departed and made for Cyzicus, which they captured and converted into a fortified camp to spend the winter. This set the pattern that continued throughout the siege: each spring, the Arabs crossed the Marmara and assaulted Constantinople, withdrawing to Cyzicus for the winter. In fact, the "siege" of Constantinople was a series of engagements around the city, which may even be stretched to include Yazid's 669 attack. Both Byzantine and Arab chroniclers record the siege as lasting for seven years instead of five. This can be reconciled either by including the opening campaigns of 672–673, or by counting the years until the final withdrawal of the Arab troops from their forward bases, in 680.

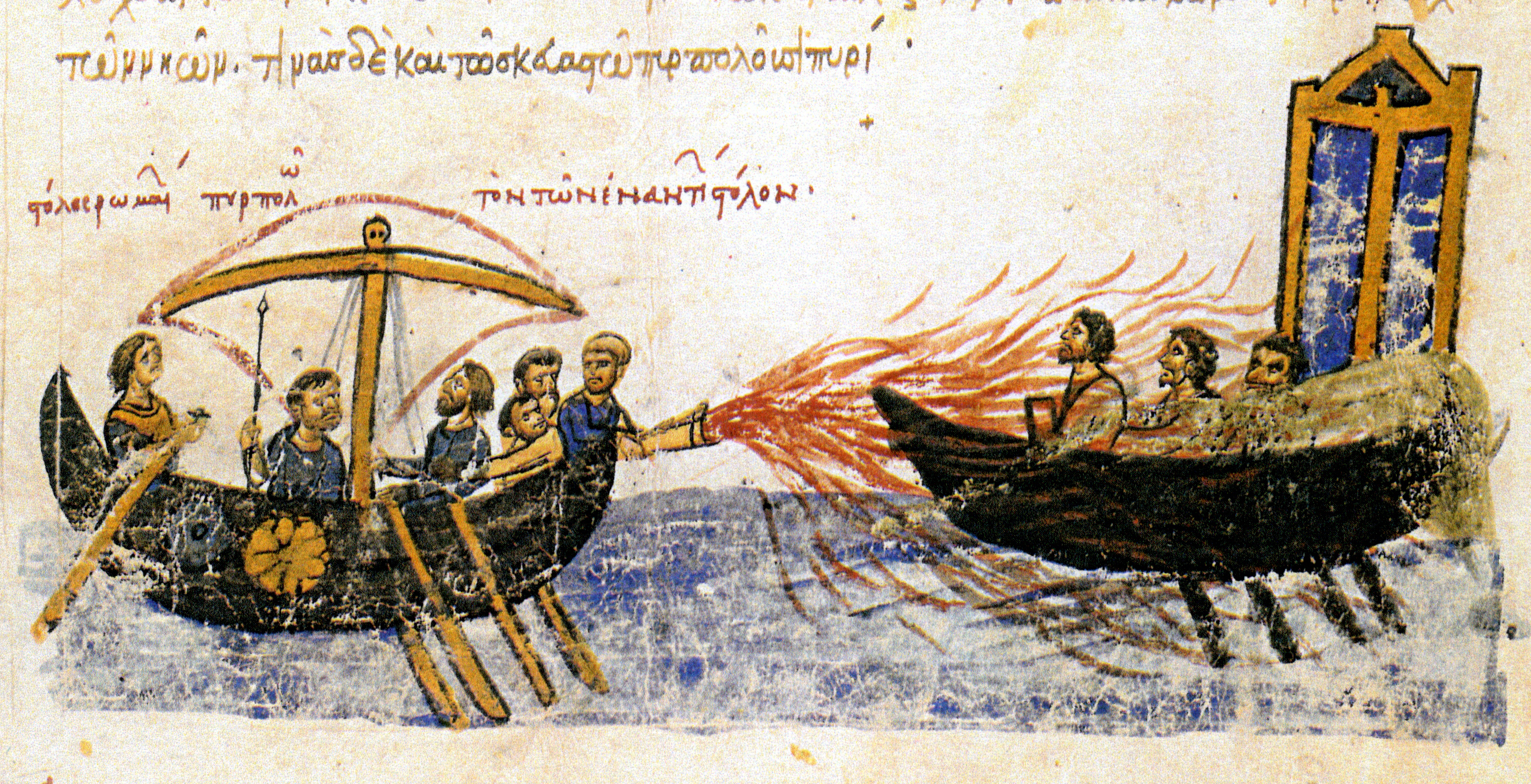
Depiction of the use of Greek fire, from the Madrid Skylitzes. It was used for the first time during the first Arab siege of Constantinople, in 677 or 678.

The details of the clashes around Constantinople are unclear, as Theophanes condenses the siege in his account of the first year, and the Arab chroniclers do not mention the siege at all but merely provide the names of leaders of unspecified expeditions into Byzantine territory. Thus from the Arab sources it is only known that Abdallah ibn Qays and Fadala ibn Ubayd raided Crete and wintered there in 675, while in the same year Malik ibn Abdallah led a raid into Asia Minor. The Arab historians al-Ya'qubi and al-Tabari report that Yazid was dispatched by Mu'awiya with reinforcements to Constantinople in 676, and record that Abdallah ibn Qays led a campaign in 677, the target of which is unknown.

At the same time, the preoccupation with the Arab threat had reduced Byzantium's ability to respond to threats elsewhere: in Italy, the Lombards used the opportunity to conquer most of Calabria, including Tarentum and Brundisium, while in the Balkans, a coalition of Slavic tribes attacked the city of Thessalonica and launched seaborne raids in the Aegean, even penetrating into the Sea of Marmara.

Finally, in late 677 or early 678 Constantine IV resolved to confront the Arab besiegers in a head-on engagement. His fleet, equipped with Greek fire, routed the Arab fleet. It is probable that the death of admiral Yazid ibn Shajara, reported by Arab chroniclers for 677/678, is related to this defeat. At about the same time, the Muslim army in Asia Minor, under the command of Sufyan ibn Awf, was defeated by the Byzantine army under the generals Phloros, Petron and Cyprian, losing 30,000 men according to Theophanes. These defeats forced the Arabs to abandon the siege in 678. On its way back to Syria, the Arab fleet was almost annihilated in a storm off Syllaion.

The essential outline of Theophanes' account may be corroborated by the only near-contemporary Byzantine reference to the siege, a celebratory poem by the otherwise unknown Theodosius Grammaticus, which was earlier believed to refer to the second Arab siege of 717–718. Theodosius' poem commemorates a decisive naval victory before the walls of the city—with the detail that the Arab fleet too possessed fire-throwing ships—and makes a reference to "the fear of their returning shadows", which may be interpreted as confirming the recurring Arab attacks each spring from their base in Cyzicus.

== Importance and aftermath ==
Constantinople was the nerve centre of the Byzantine state. Had it fallen, the empire's remaining provinces would have been unlikely to hold together and thus become easy prey for the Arabs. At the same time, the failure of the Arab attack on Constantinople was a momentous event in itself. It marked the culmination of Mu'awiya's campaign of attrition, which had been pursued steadily since 661. Immense resources were poured into the undertaking, including the creation of a huge fleet. Its failure had similarly important repercussions and represented a major blow to the Caliph's prestige. Conversely, Byzantine prestige reached new heights, especially in the West. Constantine IV received envoys from the Avars and the Balkan Slavs, who bore gifts and congratulations and acknowledging Byzantine supremacy. The subsequent peace also gave a much-needed respite from constant raiding to Asia Minor and allowed the Byzantine state to recover its balance and consolidate itself after the cataclysmic changes of the previous decades.

The failure of the Arabs before Constantinople coincided with the increased activity of the Mardaites, a Christian group living in the mountains of Syria that resisted Muslim control and raided the lowlands. Faced with the new threat and after the immense losses suffered against the Byzantines, Mu'awiya began negotiations for a truce, with embassies exchanged between the two courts. They were drawn out until 679, which gave the Arabs time for a last raid into Asia Minor under 'Amr ibn Murra, perhaps intended to put pressure on the Byzantines. The peace treaty, of a nominal 30-year duration, provided that the Caliph would pay an annual tribute of 3,000 gold pieces, 50 horses and 50 slaves. The Arab garrisons were withdrawn from their bases on the Byzantine coastlands, including Rhodes, in 679–680.

Soon after the Arab retreat from his capital, Constantine IV sent an expedition against the Slavs in the area of Thessalonica, curtailed their piracy, relieved the city and restored imperial control over the city's surroundings. After the conclusion of peace, he moved against the mounting Bulgar menace in the Balkans, but his huge army, comprising all the available forces of the empire, was decisively beaten, which opened the way for the establishment of a Bulgar state in the northeastern Balkans.

In the Muslim world, after the death of Mu'awiya in 680, the various forces of opposition within the Caliphate manifested themselves. The Caliphate's division during the Second Muslim Civil War allowed Byzantium to achieve not only peace but also a position of predominance on its eastern frontier. Armenia and Iberia reverted for a time to Byzantine control, and Cyprus became a condominium between Byzantium and the Caliphate. The peace lasted until Constantine IV's son and successor, Justinian II (r. 685–695, 705–711), broke it in 692, with devastating consequences since the Byzantines were defeated, Justinian was deposed and a twenty-year period of anarchy followed. Muslim incursions intensified, leading to a second Arab attempt at conquering Constantinople in 717–718, which also proved unsuccessful.

== Cultural impact ==
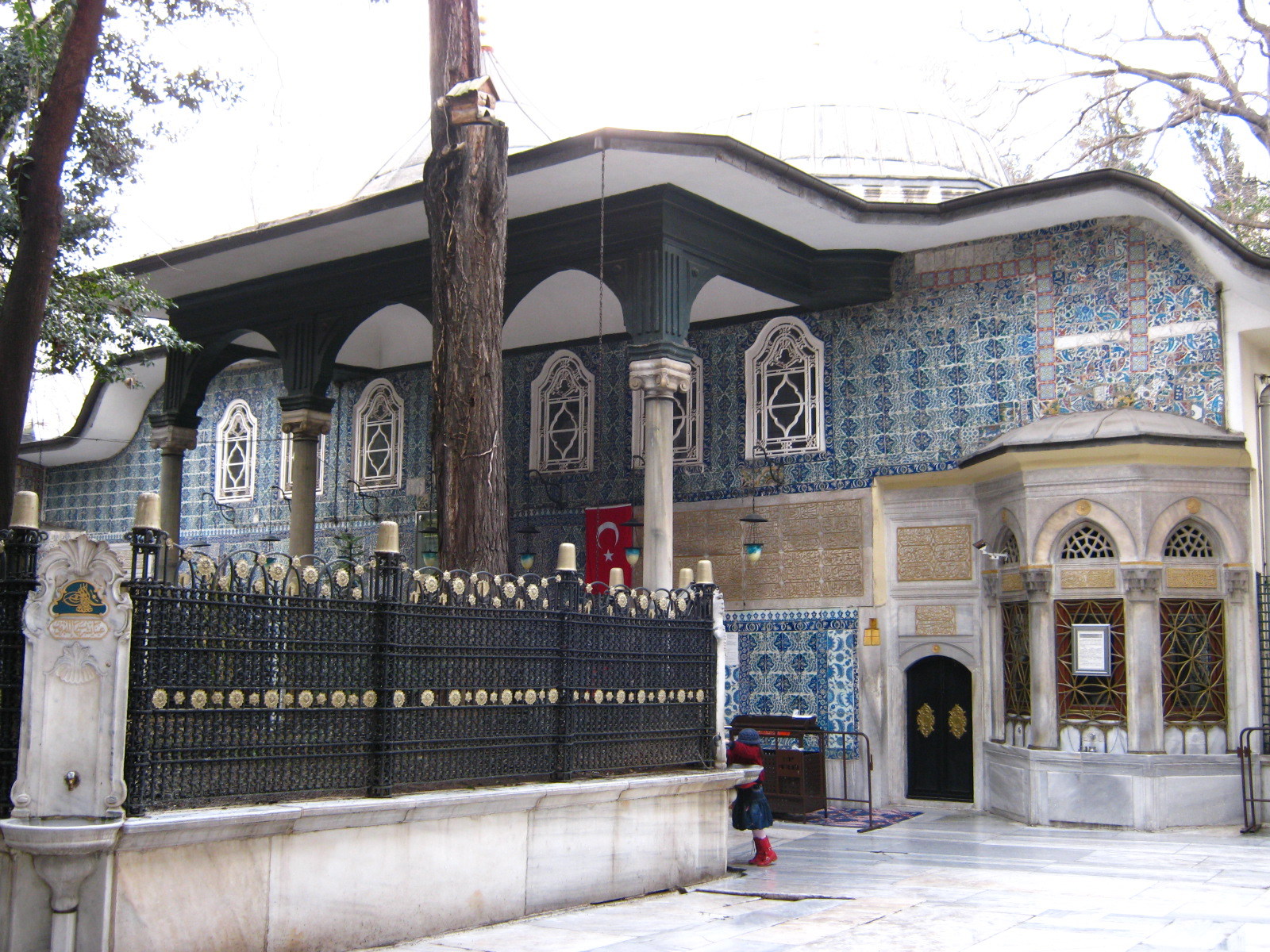
Building that houses the tomb of Abu Ayyub at Eyüp Sultan Mosque complex

Later Arab sources dwell extensively on the events of Yazid's 669 expedition and supposed attack on Constantinople, including various mythical anecdotes, which are taken by modern scholarship to refer to the events of the 674–678 siege. Several important personalities of early Islam are mentioned as taking part, such as Ibn Abbas, Ibn Umar and Ibn al-Zubayr. The most prominent among them in later tradition is Abu Ayyub al-Ansari, one of the early companions (Anṣār) and standard-bearer of Muhammad, who died of illness before the city walls during the siege and was buried there. According to Muslim tradition, Constantine IV threatened to destroy his tomb, but the Caliph warned that if he did so, the Christians under Muslim rule would suffer. Thus the tomb was left in peace, and even became a site of veneration by the Byzantines, who prayed there in times of drought. The tomb was "rediscovered" after the Fall of Constantinople to the Ottoman Turks in 1453 by the dervish Sheikh Ak Shams al-Din, and Sultan Mehmed II (r. 1444–1446, 1451–1481) ordered the construction of a marble tomb and a mosque adjacent to it. It became a tradition that Ottoman sultans were girt with the Sword of Osman at the Eyüp mosque upon their accession. Today it remains one of the holiest Muslim shrines in Istanbul.

This siege is mentioned in the Chinese dynastic histories of the Old Book of Tang and New Book of Tang. They record that the large, well-fortified capital city of Fu lin (拂菻, i.e. Byzantium) was besieged by the Da shi (大食, i.e. the Umayyad Arabs) and their commander "Mo-yi" (Chinese: 摩拽伐之, Pinyin: Mó zhuāi fá zhī), who Friedrich Hirth has identified as Mu'awiya. The Chinese histories then explain that the Arabs forced the Byzantines to pay tribute afterwards as part of a peace settlement. In these Chinese sources, Fu lin was directly related to the earlier Daqin, which is now considered by modern sinologists as the Roman Empire. Henry Yule remarked with some surprise the accuracy of the account in Chinese sources, which even named the negotiator of the peace settlement as 'Yenyo', or Ioannes Pitzigaudes, the unnamed envoy sent to Damascus in Edward Gibbon's account in which he mentions an augmentation of tributary payments a few years later due to the Umayyads facing some financial troubles.

== Modern reassessment of events ==
The narrative of the siege accepted by modern historians relies largely on Theophanes' account, while the Arab and Syriac sources do not mention any siege but rather individual campaigns, only a few of which reached as far as Constantinople. Thus the capture of an island named Arwad "in the sea of Kustantiniyya" is recorded for 673/674, but it is unclear if it refers to the Sea of Marmara or the Aegean, and Yazid's 676 expedition is also said to have reached Constantinople. The Syriac chroniclers also disagree with Theophanes in placing the decisive battle and destruction of the Arab fleet by Greek fire in 674 during an Arab expedition against the coasts of Lycia and Cilicia, rather than Constantinople. That was followed by the landing of Byzantine forces in Syria in 677/678, which began the Mardaite uprising that threatened the Caliphate's grip on Syria enough to result in the peace agreement of 678/679.

Constantin Zuckerman believes that an obscure passage in Cosmas of Jerusalem's commentary on Gregory of Nazianzus, written in the early eighth century, must refer to the Arab blockade of Constantinople. It mentions how Constantine IV had ships driven (probably on wheels) across the Thracian Chersonese from the Aegean to the Sea of Marmara, a major undertaking for imperial navy ships that makes sense only if the Dardanelles was blocked by the Arabs at Cyzicus.

Based on a re-evaluation of the original sources used by the medieval historians, the Oxford scholar James Howard-Johnston, in his 2010 book Witnesses to a World Crisis: Historians and Histories of the Middle East in the Seventh Century, rejects the traditional interpretation of events, based on Theophanes, in favour of the Syriac chroniclers' version. Howard-Johnston asserts that no siege actually took place because of not only its absence in the eastern sources but also the logistical impossibility of such an undertaking for the duration reported. Instead, he believes that the reference to a siege was a later interpolation, influenced by the events of the second Arab siege of 717–718, by an anonymous source that was later used by Theophanes. According to Howard-Johnston, "The blockade of Constantinople in the 670s is a myth which has been allowed to mask the very real success achieved by the Byzantines in the last decade of Mu'awiya's caliphate, first by sea off Lycia and then on land, through an insurgency which, before long, aroused deep anxiety among the Arabs, conscious as they were that they had merely coated the Middle East with their power".

On the other hand, the historian Marek Jankowiak argues that a major Arab siege occurred but that Theophanes (writing about 140 years after the events, based on an anonymous source, which was itself written about 50 years after the events) misdated and garbled the events and that the proper dating of the siege should be 667–669, with the major attack in early 668.

== Sources ==
- Brooks, E.W. (1898). "The Arabs in Asia Minor (641–750), from Arabic Sources". The Journal of Hellenic Studies. XVIII. The Society for the Promotion of Hellenic Studies: 182–208. doi:10.2307/623724. hdl:2027/mcg.ark:/13960/t4tj2dk5m. JSTOR 623724. S2CID 162316850.
- Canard, Marius (1926). "Les expéditions des Arabes contre Constantinople dans l'histoire et dans la légende" [The Expeditions of the Arabs Against Constantinople in History and Legend]. Journal Asiatique (in French) (208): 61–121. ISSN 0021-762X.
- El-Cheikh, Nadia Maria (2004). Byzantium Viewed by the Arabs. Cambridge, Massachusetts: Harvard Center for Middle Eastern Studies. ISBN 978-0-932885-30-2.
- Foster, John (1939). The Church of the T'ang Dynasty. London: Society for Promoting Christian Knowledge. OCLC 3790642.
- Haldon, John F. (1990). Byzantium in the Seventh Century: The Transformation of a Culture. Revised Edition. Cambridge, United Kingdom: Cambridge University Press. ISBN 978-0521319171.
- Halsall, Paul (2000) [1998]. Jerome S. Arkenberg (ed.). "East Asian History Sourcebook: Chinese Accounts of Rome, Byzantium and the Middle East, c. 91 B.C.E. – 1643 C.E." Fordham.edu. Fordham University. Archived from the original on 2014-09-10..
- Howard-Johnston, James (2010). Witnesses to a World Crisis: Historians and Histories of the Middle East in the Seventh Century. Oxford: Oxford University Press. ISBN 978-0-19-920859-3.
- Jankowiak, Marek (2013). "The First Arab Siege of Constantinople". In Zuckerman, Constantin (ed.). Travaux et mémoires, Vol. 17: Constructing the Seventh Century. Paris: Association des Amis du Centre d’Histoire et Civilisation de Byzance. pp. 237–320.
- Jenkins, Philip (2008). The Lost History of Christianity: the Thousand-Year Golden Age of the Church in the Middle East, Africa, and Asia – and How It Died. New York: Harper Collins. ISBN 978-0-06-147280-0.
- Kaegi, Walter E. (2008). "Confronting Islam: Emperors versus Caliphs (641–c. 850)". In Shepard, Jonathan (ed.). The Cambridge History of the Byzantine Empire c. 500–1492. Cambridge: Cambridge University Press. pp. 365–394. ISBN 978-0-52-183231-1.
- Lilie, Ralph-Johannes (1976). Die byzantinische Reaktion auf die Ausbreitung der Araber. Studien zur Strukturwandlung des byzantinischen Staates im 7. und 8. Jhd [Byzantine Reaction to the Expansion of the Arabs. Studies on the Structural Change of the Byzantine State in the 7th and 8th Cent.] (in German). Munich: Institut für Byzantinistik und Neugriechische Philologie der Universität München. OCLC 797598069.
- Mango, Cyril; Scott, Roger (1997). The Chronicle of Theophanes Confessor. Byzantine and Near Eastern History, AD 284–813. Oxford: Oxford University Press. ISBN 978-0-19-822568-3.
- Olster, David (1995). "Theodosius Grammaticus and the Arab Siege of 674–78". Byzantinoslavica. 56 (1): 23–28. ISSN 0007-7712.
- Stratos, Andreas N. (1978). Byzantium in the Seventh Century, Volume IV: 668–685. Amsterdam: Adolf M. Hakkert. ISBN 9789025606657.
- Stratos, Andreas N. (1983). "Siège ou blocus de Constantinople sous Constantin IV" [Siege or Blockade of Constantinople under Constantine IV]. Jahrbuch der österreichischen Byzantinistik (in French). 33. Vienna: Verlag der Österreichischen Akademie der Wissenschaften: 89–107. ISSN 0378-8660.
- Treadgold, Warren (1997). A History of the Byzantine State and Society. Stanford, California: Stanford University Press. ISBN 0-8047-2630-2.
- Turnbull, Stephen (2004). The Walls of Constantinople, AD 324–1453. Oxford: Osprey Publishing. ISBN 978-1-84176-759-8.
- Yule, Henry (1915). Cathay and the Way Thither: Being a Collection of Medieval Notices of China, Vol I: Preliminary Essay on the Intercourse Between China and the Western Nations Previous to the Discovery of the Cape Route. London: Hakluyt Society.
- Zuckerman, Constantin (1995). "A Gothia in the Hellespont in the Early Eighth Century". Byzantine and Modern Greek Studies. 19 (1): 234–241. doi:10.1179/030701395790836649. S2CID 162205022.
