= Fadala ibn Ubayd =

7th-century Umayyad commander and qadi of Damascus

Fadala ibn Ubayd al-Ansari (Arabic: فَضَالَةَ بْنِ عُبَيْدٍ الأَنْصَارِيِّ, romanized: Faḍāla ibn ʿUbayd al-Anṣārī; died 673 or 678/79) was the qadi of Damascus and a commander under the Umayyad caliph Mu'awiya I (r. 661–680). The Islamic and Byzantine sources variously report several military campaigns, including a number of naval raids, headed by Fadala between 667/68 and 672. His wintering in Cyzicus has been associated with the first Arab siege of Constantinople. He is generally held to have died as qadi in Damascus in 673 by the Muslim sources, though Khalifa ibn Khayyat places his death in 678/79.

== Early life and career ==
Fadala ibn Ubayd was a companion of the Islamic prophet Muhammad and belonged to the Ansar (early supporters of Muhammad from Medina). He participated in the Muslim conquest of Egypt in the early 640s, then settled in Damascus in Syria. There, he was a student of Abu al-Darda (d. 652), the qadi (head judge) of the city. Abu al-Darda chose him as his successor. Fadala was among the minority of Ansarites who did not pay homage to Caliph Ali, who acceded following the killing of Caliph Uthman in 656. Fadala and the minority of Ansarites, including Zayd ibn Thabit, Maslama ibn Mukhallad and Nu'man ibn Bashir, were considered Uthmaniyya (partisans of Uthman).

== Commander in Arab–Byzantine wars ==
Fadala was a general in the Arab–Byzantine wars under Caliph Mu'awiya I (r. 661–680). Theophilus of Edessa (d. 785) placed Fadala (Phadalas in Greek sources) as the commander of the winter campaign against the Hexapolis in 667/68, and held that he was reinforced by Mu'awiya's son Yazid in the following year. According to al-Khwarazimi and al-Tabari (d. 923), Fadala led the winter campaign against the Byzantines in 669/670, during which he took numerous captives, according to al-Ya'qubi (d. 897). Ibn Abd al-Hakam (d. 871) noted that Fadala led the Syrian naval forces, while Uqba ibn Amir led the Egyptian navy. The same historian held that Fadala wintered in Cyzicus, across the Sea of Marmara from the Byzantine capital Constantinople, in 671/72. Al-Ya'qubi and al-Tabari list him as the commander of the winter campaign against the Byzantines again in 671/72, while Khalifa ibn Khayyat (d. 854) noted that he led the Arab naval forces during that campaign. The object of that campaign, which was a raid, was traditionally interpreted as being the island of Djerba in modern Tunisia, though the historian Marek Jankowiak argues the evidence for this to be insufficient.

== Death ==
Fadala died in Damascus as qadi in 673, according to most Muslim sources. Theophanes the Confessor (d. 818) mentioned that Fadala and Abd Allah ibn Qays raided Crete in 674. Ibn Khayyat placed Fadala's death in 678/79. He was buried near Abu al-Darda and his wife Umm al-Darda in the Bab al-Saghir cemetery, where his tomb was a visitation site as late as the 16th century. Fadala was succeeded by Abu Darda's son Bilal or al-Nu'aym ibn Bashir. One of Fadala's students, Abd al-Rahman ibn al-Hashas al-Udhri, served as the qadi of Damascus under Caliph Umar II (r. 717–720).

== Bibliography ==
- Brockett, Adrian, ed. (1997). The History of al-Ṭabarī, Volume XVI: The Community Divided: The Caliphate of ʿAlī I, A.D. 656–657/A.H. 35–36. SUNY Series in Near Eastern Studies. Albany, New York: State University of New York Press. ISBN 978-0-7914-2391-2.
- Caskel, Werner (1966). Ğamharat an-nasab: Das genealogische Werk des His̆ām ibn Muḥammad al-Kalbī, Volume II (in German). Leiden: Brill.
- Jankowiak, Marek (2013). "The First Arab Siege of Constantinople". In Zuckerman, Constantin (ed.). Travaux et mémoires, Vol. 17: Constructing the Seventh Century. Paris: Association des Amis du Centre d’Histoire et Civilisation de Byzance. pp. 237–320.
- Judd, Steven C. (2014). Religious Scholars and the Umayyads: Piety-Minded Supporters of the Marwanid Caliphate. Abingdon, Oxon: Routledge. ISBN 978-0-415-84497-0.
- Meri, Josef W. (2001). "Guide to Pilgrimage Places, also known as Syrian Pilgrimage Places". Medieval Encounters. 7 (1): 19–78. doi:10.1163/157006701x00085.
- Tsigonaki, Christina (2019). "Crete, a Border at the Sea: Defensive Works and Landscape–Mindscape Changes, Seventh–Eighth Centuries A.D.". In Ontiveros, Miguel Angel Cau; Florit, Catalina Mas (eds.). Change and Resilience: The Occupation of Mediterranean Islands in Late Antiquity. Oxford: Oxbow Books. ISBN 978-1-78925-180-7.
