= Umm al-Darda as-Sughra =

7th-century jurist and scholar of Islam

Umm al Darda as Sughra al Dimashqiyyah (also known as Umm al Darda the Younger), was a 7th-century jurist and scholar of Islam in Damascus and Jerusalem. She is not to be confused with Umm al-Darda, wife of the sahaba Abu Darda.

== Biography ==
=== Early life ===
She was an orphan under the guardianship of Abul Darda. As a child, she used to sit with male scholars in the mosque, praying in men's rows and studying Quran with them. She remarked “I’ve tried to worship Allah in every way, but I’ve never found a better one than sitting around debating with other scholars.”

=== Teaching ===
Besides holding her classes in the mosques of Damascus and Jerusalem she also taught in her house. As a teacher Umm al-Darda entered the men's section of the mosque (under any other circumstances a forbidden place for women). She enjoyed having both female and male students. Notably, the caliph Abd al-Malik ibn Marwan was one of her class's regular participants.

Umm al-Darda taught a large number of students. One day a student asked her why she was so dedicated to teaching: Have we wearied you? To that she replied: You (pl.) weary me? I have sought worship in everything. I did not find anything more relieving to me than sitting with scholars and exchanging knowledge with them.

=== Views ===
She was issued a fatwa, allowing women to pray in the same sitting position (tashahhud) as men.

Ahmad ibn Hanbal, related to Zayd ibn Aslam said:

"Umm Darda would regularly be a guest of Abd al-Malik, and he would ask her questions about the Prophet, peace be upon him. He said, 'He arose one night and called his maid. However, she wasn't fast enough for him, so he cursed her. In response, she said, "Do not curse, for Abud-Darda relayed to me that he heard the Messenger of Allah, peace be upon him, say, 'Those who curse will not be witnesses or interceders on the Day of Judgement.' " ' "

She was regarded by Ibrahim ibn Abi Ablah as a pious and modest woman. In Ibn 'Asakir 's Ta'rikh madinat Dimashq, Tarajim al-nisa wrote that: "I saw Umm al-Darda in Jerusalem sitting among poor women. A man came and gave some money to them. He gave Umm al-Darda a fals (a copper). She said to her servant: Buy camel meat with it. Is not that money sadaqah? Umm al-Darda said: it came to us unasked."

== Legacy ==
Umm al-Darda was held by Iyas ibn Mu'awiya, an important traditionist of the time and a judge of undisputed ability and merit, to be superior to all the other traditionists of the period, including the celebrated masters of hadith like Hasan al-Basri and Ibn Sirin.

A centre for teaching the Quran, hifz and tajwid to women has been established in Bahrain in her name.
