= Nadia Amara =

Egyptian Islamic preacher and communicator

- ناديه عماره
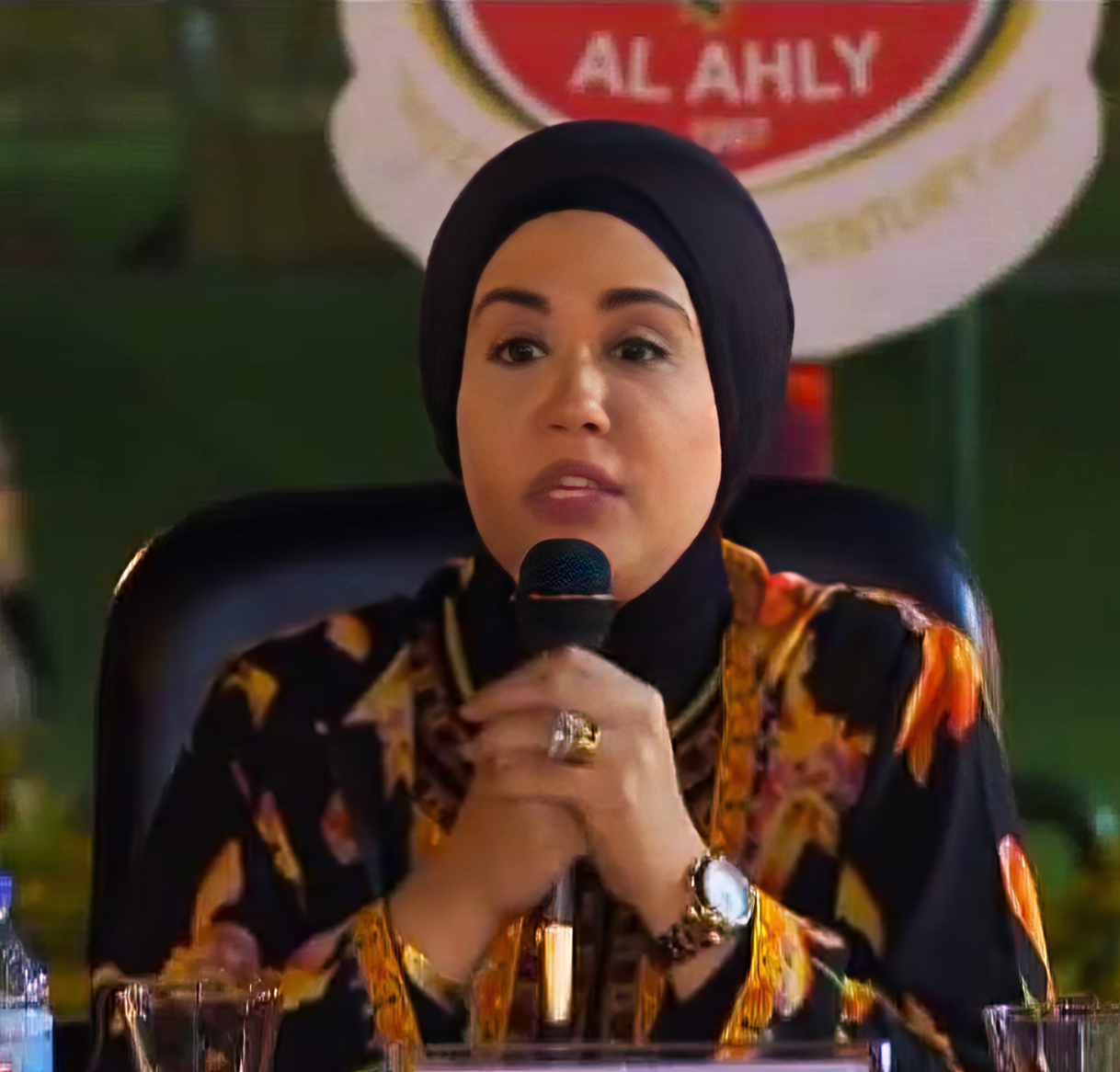
- Nadia Amara in 2018
- Born: Alexandria, Egypt
- Education: Alexandria University
- Occupation: Islamic preacher
- Spouse: Ismail Matar
- Children: 2

Nadia Amara (Egyptian Arabic: راندة المنشاوي) is an Egyptian Islamic preacher and an expert in Islamic jurisprudence relating to women.

== Early life and education ==
Amara was born in Alexandria, Egypt as the eldest daughter in a conservative family. Her father (d. 2018) was a colonel who instilled in her the memorisation of the Qur'an, and her mother was a schoolteacher in Alexandria. As a child Amara practised several sports. At the age of 16, she obtained a licence to teach the Qur'an at the Al-Mowasa Mosque in Alexandria.

In 1998, she graduated with a degree in Arabic with a specialisation in Islamic studies from the University of Alexandria. She subsequently obtained a master's degree in Islamic studies, specialising in the interpretation of the Qur’an, and a doctorate in Qur'anic exegesis. Amara was a student of the renowned Islamic preacher Muhammad Metwalli al-Sha'rawi.

== Career ==
After graduating, Amara taught Arabic, as well as Quranic interpretation and recitation, to non-Arabic speakers.

She began her career in 2000 in media with the Islamic programmes Anwar Ramadan and Anwar Al Salam on ART International. Amara subsequently left that channel to present the programme Women's Jurisprudence on Iqraa, and the programme Hearts Full on ON E, where she also talks about topics related to Islamic jurisprudence and women, and in which, during Ramadan, she teaches children lessons on the Qur’an, recitation and intonation. She has worked for other channels such as Al Hayat TV and Al-Nas TV, in the programme Khadija. She also presented the programme Letters of Light and hosted My Mind on the DMC, Al-Nas, Egyptian Television and Radio 9090 channels.

Amara is recognised as one of Egypt’s most prominent female Islamic preachers, and her preaching is characterised by the promotion of a moderate form of Islam, following in the doctrine of Abla al-Kahlawi. She is member of the Cultural Committee of the National Council for Women and the media professionals’ union.

== Personal life ==
She is married to naval captain Ismail Matar, with whom she has two children.

== Works ==
- Quranic Stories in the Interpretation of Sheikh Al-Shaarawi
- Issues of Muslim Women between Tradition and Renewal
- Interpretation of Sura Al-Anbiya
