= Hafsa bint Sirin =

Early scholar of Islam

- Born: 651 CE; Basra, Iraq
- Died: 719 (aged 67–68); Basra, Iraq

Hafsa bint Sirin (Arabic: حفصة بنت سيرين, b.651 – d.718/719 CE) was an early female scholar of Islam. She has been called one of the "pioneers in the history of female asceticism in Islam".

She lived and taught in Basra. She was known for her piety and knowledge of practical and legal aspects of Islamic traditions. She has been credited with seventeen traditions.

She was the sister of Muhammad ibn Sirin, a man known for dream interpretation.

== See also ==
- Umm al-Darda
