= John Pitzigaudes =

John Pitzigaudes (Greek: Ἰωάννης Πιτζιγαῦδης), his surname variously also given as Pitzigaudios (Πιτζιγαύδιος), Pitzogabdes (Πιτζογάβδης), and Pittigaudes (Πιττιγαύδης) by different Byzantine chroniclers, was a Byzantine official and envoy.

He is mentioned by Theophanes the Confessor, as well as the later chroniclers Symeon Logothetes, Patriarch Nikephoros I of Constantinople, Theodosius of Melitene, George Monachos, Kedrenos, Zonaras, and in Emperor Constantine VII's De administrando imperio. According to these accounts, he was of noble origin, a patrikios, and was highly experienced in political matters. Following the failed First Arab Siege of Constantinople he was sent, probably in 678, by Emperor Constantine IV, to conclude a peace treaty with the Umayyad caliph Mu'awiya I. According to Henry Yule, he is to be identified with the Byzantine envoy "Yenyo", who is mentioned in the Chinese Old Book of Tang as leading the negotiations with the Ta shi (the Arabs).

== Sources ==
- Lilie, Ralph-Johannes; Ludwig, Claudia; Pratsch, Thomas; Zielke, Beate (2013). Prosopographie der mittelbyzantinischen Zeit Online. Berlin-Brandenburgische Akademie der Wissenschaften. Nach Vorarbeiten F. Winkelmanns erstellt (in German). Berlin and Boston: De Gruyter.
- Yule, Henry (1915). Cathay and the Way Thither: Being a Collection of Medieval Notices of China, Vol I: Preliminary Essay on the Intercourse Between China and the Western Nations Previous to the Discovery of the Cape Route. London: Hakluyt Society.
