= Abu al-Darda =

Companion (Sahabi) of Muhammad (died 652 CE)

- Born: Uwaymir; Yathrib, Arabia
- Died: c. 652; Damascus, Rashidun Caliphate
- Burial place: Bab al-Saghir, Damascus
- Known for: Companion of Muhammad; Quran instructor Qadi of Damascus
- Spouse: Umm al-Darda
- Family: Balharith (family); Banu Khazraj (tribe)

Uwaymir ibn Zayd ibn Qays al-Ansari (Arabic: عُوَيْمِر بْن زَيْد بْن قَيْس الأَنْصَارِيّ, romanized: ʿUwaymir ibn Zayd ibn Qays al-Anṣārī), better known by the kunya Abu al-Darda (Arabic: أَبُو الدَّرْدَاءِ, romanized: Abū al-Dardāʾ, died 32 AH/652 CE) was a companion of the Islamic prophet Muhammad who was known for being a leading authority on and teacher of the Quran. He was the first qadi of Damascus. He was the husband of his fellow companion, Umm al-Darda.

== Biography ==
Abu al-Darda's name was Uwaymir ibn Zayd ibn Qays ibn A'isha ibn Umayya, though his given name may have been Amir, and his father's name is also given in the sources as Tha'laba, Amir, Abd Allah, and Malik. He belonged to the Balharith family of the Khazraj tribe of Yathrib. The Islamic prophet Muhammad emigrated from Mecca to Yathrib, which thenceforth became known as 'Medina'. He was embraced by the Khazraj and its brother tribe, the Banu Aws, and the two tribes collectively became known as the Ansar ("helpers"), to differentiate them from the Muhajirun ("emigrants"), the term for Muhammad's fellow emigrants from Mecca.

Although most of his family converted to Islam soon after Muhammad made Medina his seat, Abu al-Darda, then a youth, converted after the Battle of Badr in 624. He may have participated alongside the Muslims against the Quraysh at the Battle of Uhud in 627. When Muhammad designated brotherhoods between the Ansar and Muhajirun, Abu al-Darda was made a 'brother' of Salman al-Farisi.

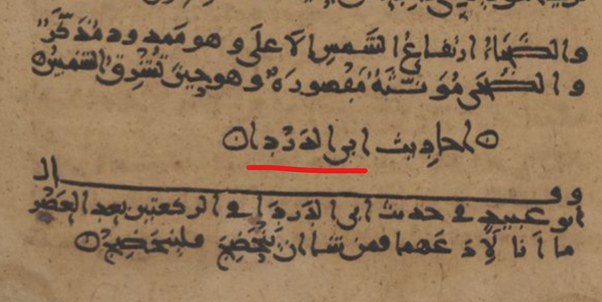
The name of Abu Al-Dardaa', highlighted in red. From the hadith manuscript MS. Leiden Or. 298, dated 866 CE.

A claim traced to Abu al-Darda holds that he was a merchant before his conversion, but afterwards he abandoned commercial pursuits as they detracted from his devotion to religious duties. Later Islamic tradition described him as an ascetic, pietist, and zahid. In this tradition, he is credited with being the sage of the early Muslim community. Abu al-Darda's principal authority derived from his knowledge of the Quran; he was one of the few individuals who collected Quranic revelations from Muhammad during the latter's lifetime.

Under instruction from caliph Umar (r. 634–644), the governor of Islamic Syria, Mu'awiya ibn Abi Sufyan, appointed Abu al-Darda the first qadi of Damascus, Syria's chief city. There, he often assembled students at the city's mosque to instruct them in the Quran. He is thus considered the true father of the Damascus school, according to the historian Arthur Jeffery. He died in Damascus in 652 and was buried alongside his wife, Umm al-Darda, at the city's Bab al-Saghir gate.

== Legacy ==
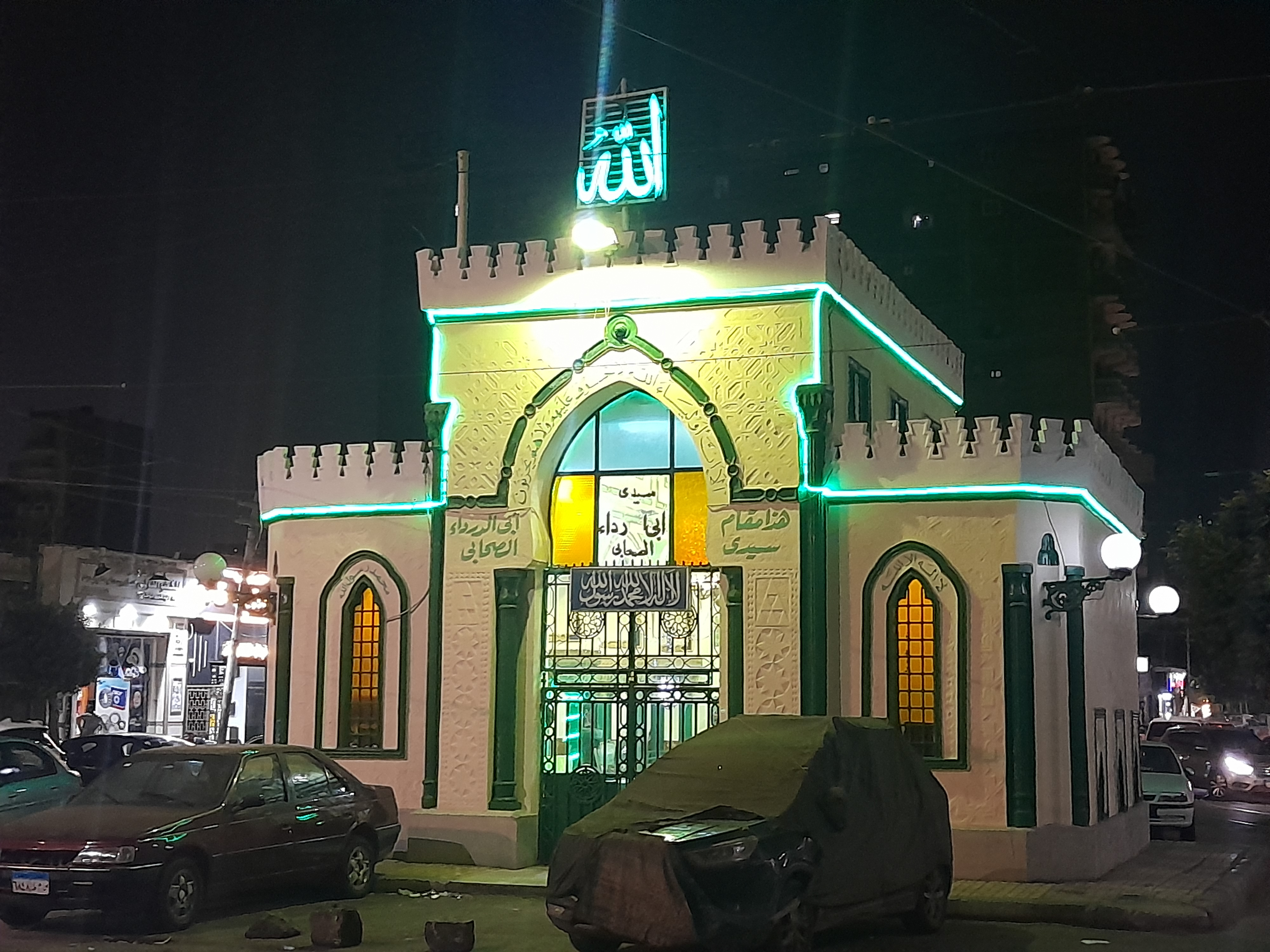
Tomb of Abu Darda in Alexandria.

According to the historian Steven Judd, "for nearly a century, Abu al-Darda and his students dominated the office of qadi in Damascus". His student and chosen successor, Fadala ibn Ubayd, served until his death in 673. All the qadis of Damascus during Umayyad rule (661–750), at least until the 740s, were either students of Abu al-Darda, or were taught by Abu al-Darda's students. His son, Bilal, was the qadi between 679 and 684, while two other students, Abu Idris al-Khawlani and Numayr ibn Aws al-Ash'ari, served in the same office from 684 to 699 and from c. 718 to c. 738, respectively. Towards the end of the Umayyad period, Abu al-Darda's influence became less direct; his student, Sa'id ibn al-Musayyib, instructed the pro-Umayyad scholars Ibn Shihab al-Zuhri and Makhul al-Shami, both of whom, in turn, were teachers of later Syrian scholars al-Awza'i and Yazid ibn Abd al-Rahman.

== See also ==
- List of Sahabah

== Bibliography ==
- Jeffery, A. (1960). "Abū al-Dardāʾ". In Gibb, H. A. R.; Kramers, J. H.; Lévi-Provençal, E.; Schacht, J.; Lewis, B. & Pellat, Ch. (eds.). The Encyclopaedia of Islam, Second Edition. Volume I: A–B. Leiden: E. J. Brill. pp. 113–114. OCLC 495469456.
- Judd, Steven C. (2014). Religious Scholars and the Umayyads: Piety-Minded Supporters of the Marwanid Caliphate. New York and London: Routledge. ISBN 978-0-415-84497-0.
