= Sitt al-'Ajam =

13th century Sufi mystic from Baghdad

Sitt al-Ajam was a 13th century Sufi mystic from Baghdad. Her main merit was writing a commentary on ibn Arabi's Mashahid. Her full name is Sitt al-Ajam bint al-Nafis b. Abu l-Qasim.

== Coincidence with name ==
In the history of female Muslim scholars two women are to be found bearing the same name. Fatima Mernissi argues that the Arabic term sitt literally means 'lady' and has been often attributed to women of power. However, with some exceptions, she listed three names beginning with sitt: one is Sitt al-Ajam not connected with the issue of politics at all. According to her, Sitt al-'Ajam is a fiqh scholar who lived in the 14th-century in Damascus.

The name can be confused with Sitt al-'Ajam bint al-Nafis (the subject of this article), a 13th-century Sufi woman whose thoughts on ibn Al-Arabi were transmitted by her husband. Sitt al-'Ajam confessed in her book that she had a vision of ibn Al-Arabi who came to her and asked her to write a commentary on his book Mashāhid al-asrār al-qudsiyya wa matāli' al-anwār al-ilāhiyya (The Witnessing of the Holy Mysteries and the Rising of the Divine Lights). She explained in her words: "I closely examined his name and his biography, for a way to draw from him the definition [for my state], but I found that the similarity between us is in receiving the very same "hātimī gifts", that leads to attraction (jadhb). This, despite not having the same state of distinction, nor following the same path, nor having the same life; [the] similarity is [only] that of character and of [divine] bestowal, which is the privilege of the saints (awliyā'). Thus, his luminous form could not but be witness to the knowledge of union that exists between us."

== The term ajam ==
The term ajam is Arabic and denotes one who is not of Arabic origin and whose native language is not Arabic. Mostly it referred to Persians. After the conquest of Persia by the Arabs the term took on pejorative connotations. It could be met as a surname. In the case of Sitt al-Ajam it pinpoints that her ancestors were not Arab in origin.

== Commentary on ibn Arabi's Mashahid ==
Sitt al-'Ajam's commentary is of impressive size and runs to about three hundred pages. She managed to write two more books on mysterious themes: Kashf al-kunūz (Unveiling the Treasures) and Kitāb al-Khatm (The Book of the Seal). Michel Chodkiewicz in An Ocean Without Shore: Ibn Arabi, the Book, and the Law called her commentary 'very beautiful' and that it was inspired by a purely imaginary vision of ibn-'Arabi and conversing with him in front of the gathering of the prophets. He underlines that she intentionally did not aim to explain such parts of hermeneutic analysis of the text as, for instance, the structure of the text.
