= Salwa El-Awa =

Egyptian-British academic

Salwa El-Awa is an Egyptian-British linguist and Islamic scholar. She is currently a lecturer of Arabic and Islamic Studies at Swansea University.

== Academic career ==
El-Awa's academic interests include Arabic linguistics, modern linguistic analysis of the Qur'an, translation studies, discourse analysis, hadith studies, and modern Islamist movements.

Her work discusses textual relations in the Quran using modern linguistic analysis. El-Awa in her book The Qur'anic Text: Relevance, Coherence and Structure, analyzed surahs 33 and 75 using coherence theory to show that these chapters cohere and share a contextual relationship.

El-Awa was previously a lecturer in Qur'anic studies at the University of Birmingham.

== Publications ==
=== Books ===
- (1998). Al-Wujuh Wa al-Naza’ir: dirasa fi Siyaq al-Qur’an
- (2005). The Qur'anic Text: Relevance, Coherence and Structure. Routledge

=== Articles ===
- Discourse Markers as Indicators of Text Structure in the multiple-topic Qur’anic suras: a meta-analysis of Q:2. Journal of Qur'anic Studies
- (2019) Governance and Counter-Terrorism: engaging moderate and non-violent extremist movements in combatting Jihadist-linked Terrorism.
- (2019) Discourse markers and the structure of intertextual relations of medium length Qur'anic suras: the case of Sūrat Ṭā Hā.
- (2017) The Linguistic Structure in Andrew Rippin and Jawid Mujaddidi (ed.), Blackwell's Companion to the Qur'an, 2nd edition.
