= Ezzia Ali Taha =

Islamic Sudanese academic (Died 2012)

- عزِّية علي طه
- Died: January 25, 2012; Riyadh
- Other names: Ezzia Ali Taha Ṭāhā, ʻUzayyah ʻAlī
- Education: Al-Azhar University (Degrees: PhD and MA)
- Occupation: alimah
- Employer: King Khalid University Kuwait University
- Notable work: Taʼammulāt ḥawla makānat al-marʼah fī al-Yahūdīyah wa-al-Masīḥīyah wa-al-Islām 1990

Ezzia Ali Taha (died 2012 January 25, Riyadh), also spelled ʻUzayyah ʻAlī Ṭāhā, was a Sudanese academic and Muslim scholar who authored texts regarding religion and gender issues.

== Publications ==
- Sin and Forgiveness in Christianity and Islam
