= Abdallah ibn Qais =

Umayyad general

- عبد الله بن قيس
- Relatives: Qais (father)
- Military career
- Allegiance: Umayyad
- Branch: Navy
- Rank: Admiral-in-chief

Abdallah ibn Qais (Arabic: عبد الله بن قيس) (Κάϊσος, Kaisos and Ἀβδελᾶς, Abdelas in Greek sources) was an Umayyad military leader active against the Byzantine Empire in the 670s. In ca. 672/673 he led a raid into Cilicia and Lycia, and wintered there before returning to Syria. In 674/675, by which time, according to al-Tabari, he was admiral-in-chief of the Umayyad navy, he led a raid against the island of Crete along with general Fadala ibn Ubayd.

== Sources ==
- Lilie, Ralph-Johannes; Ludwig, Claudia; Pratsch, Thomas; Zielke, Beate (1999). "'Abdallāh ibn Qais (# 12)". Prosopographie der mittelbyzantinischen Zeit: 1. Abteilung (641–867), Band 1: Aaron (# 1) – Georgios (# 2182) (in German). Berlin and Boston: De Gruyter. pp. 4–5. ISBN 978-3-11-015179-4.
