= Fatima al-Batayahiyyah =

Female Islamic Scholar of Abbasid era

Fatima al-Batayahiyyah فاطمہ البطيحيہ

Personal life
- Born: Abbasid Caliphate
- Died: Medina, Abbasid Caliphate
- Parent: Ibrahim ibn Mahmūd al-Bațā'ihiyy
- Era: Islamic Golden Age (Abbasid era)
- Region: Abbasid Caliphate
- Main interest(s): Science of Hadith and Islamic theology
- Known for: Famous female Islamic scholar

Religious life
- Religion: Islam

Fāțima bint Ibrahim ibn Mahmūd al-Bațā'ihiyya also known as Fatima al-Batayahiyyah was a Muslim scholar of hadith in the 8th century.

== Biography ==
Fatima al-Batayahiyyah taught Sahih Bukhari in Damascus. She was known as one of the greatest scholars of that period, demonstrated especially during the Hajj when leading male scholars of the day flocked from afar to hear her speak in person.

When she had become old, she moved to Madinah and taught her students for days in the Prophet's mosque itself. Whenever she tired, she would rest her head on the Muhammad's grave and continue to teach her students. This tradition is contrasted with the practice today, where people are not allowed to view Muhammad's resting place.
