= Taqiyya Umm Ali bint Ghaith ibn Ali al-Armanazi =

12th-century Arabic poet of Later Abbasid Era

Sitt al-Ni‘m ست النعم Umm Ali Taqiyya bint Abi’l-Faraj Ghayth bin ‘Ali bin ‘Abd al-Salām
- Born: 1111; Damascus
- Died: 1183/84; Egypt
- Occupation: Arabic Poet
- Spouse: Fādl bin Ḥamdūn al-Ṣūrī
- Children: Abu al-Hasan Ali
- Writing career
- Pen name: Sitt al-Ni‘m
- Language: Arabic
- Period: Islamic Golden Age (Later Abbasid era)

Umm ‘Alī Taqiyya bint Abi’l-Faraj Ghayth b. ‘Alī b. ‘Abd al-Salām b. Muḥammad b. Ja‘far al-Sulamī al-Armanāzī al-Ṣūrī (أم علي تقية بنت أبى الفرج غيث بن على بن عبد السلام بن محمد بن جعفر السلمي الأرمنازي الصوري), also known as Sitt al-Ni‘m (ست النعم) (505/1111 in Damascus 505/1111 – 570/1183–84, probably in Egypt), was a poet and scholar, the most prominent female student of Abū Ṭāhir al-Silafī, the leading educator in Egypt in his day.

Several sources acknowledge her as woman of talent and wit, who composed qaṣīdas and short poems.'

Taqiyya's husband was Fāḍil b. Ḥamdūn al-Ṣūrī (born Damascus 490/1097, died Alexandria 568/1172), himself a noted scholar; with him she had the son Abu’l-Ḥasan ‘Alī b. Fāḍil b. Ḥamdūn al-Ṣūrī (b. Ṣūr, d. 603/1206), who also became a noted scholar.

Among the few poems of Taqiyya's that survive is an epigram on wine the she sent to Al-Muzaffar Umar:

There is nothing good in wine, though a paradisial perk
It ferments the sane, bonkers his mind and instils in him a falling fear.

When al-Muzaffar responded that Taqiyya was speaking from experience, she composed a poem on war, to show that experience was not required to compose poetry on a theme.
