= Suad Salih =

Egyptian TV host and Islamic scholar (born 1945)

Suad Ibrahim Salih
- سعاد إبراهيم صالح
- Born: 1945 (age 80–81)
- Occupations: Islamic scholar, television host

Suad Ibrahim Salih (Arabic: سعاد إبراهيم صالح; born 1945) is an Egyptian television personality, preacher, and Islamic scholar. She is Professor and Head of Comparative Jurisprudence and Dean of the Faculty of the Women's College at Al-Azhar University. She was formerly dean of Islamic and Arabic studies for women at Mansoura University.

== Biography ==
In 1998, Salih campaigned in Egypt to allow women to serve as mufti. She petitioned the Grand Mufti of Egypt, Nasr Farid Wasil, to allow her to become a mufti and issue fatwas, arguing Islam does not prohibit women from serving as muftis.

She has authored works of gender analysis on Islamic law.

Salih was featured in the 2010 documentary Veiled Voices by Brigid Maher and Karen Bauer, that profiles Middle Eastern female Islamic scholars.

== Controversies ==
In 2007, Salih called for an 11-year old rape victim, Hind, and her father to be flogged for defamation in mistakenly accusing the wrong man of rape. Hind had become pregnant as a result of the rape. Salih questioned the age of the victim, asserting that she was 16. This was contested by the victim's family.

In March 2010, she opposed a bill to legalize abortion and sterilization of women whose health or finances are incompatible with having children.

On her television program in 2014 on Al-Hayat, Salih argued that Islam allows Muslim men in warfare to capture non-Muslim women, enslave them, and have sex with them as concubines to humiliate them.
