= Junada ibn Abi Umayya al-Azdi =

Junada ibn Abi Umayya al-Azdi (Arabic: جنادة بن أبي أمية الأزدي, died 699) was a Syria-based commander of naval and land forces under the Umayyad caliph Mu'awiya I (r. 661–680) and a transmitter of hadiths (earliest Islamic traditions).

== Life ==
Junada was a member of the Arab tribe of Azd. He belonged to the branch of Zahran of the clan of Daws, which were resident in the Sarat Mountains between the Hejaz (western Arabia). He knew the first two caliphs, Abu Bakr (r. 632–634) and Umar (r. 634–644), as well as Mu'adh ibn Jabal, another close companion of the Islamic prophet Muhammad. He transmitted hadiths which he memorized from them and was generally considered to be a reliable authority. He was likely a child by the time of Muhammad's death in 632. He died in 699.

=== Campaigns against the Byzantines ===
Junada may have participated in the Muslim conquest of Egypt in the 640s. According to early Muslim Egyptian and Syrian sources, Junada oversaw the naval raids against the Byzantine Empire initiated during the governorship of Syria by Mu'awiya I, the future founder of the Umayyad Caliphate. Junada's activities were halted during the First Muslim Civil War (656–661), likely as Mu'awiya had to concentrate his troops and treasure in his confrontation with Caliph Ali.

After Mu'awiya became caliph in 661, Junada resumed his role as the overall commander of naval raids. All of the early Islamic histories of the Arab–Byzantine wars mention at least one raid led by Junada against the Byzantines in the period of 672/73–679/80, during Mu'awiya I's reign. The Islamic histories of al-Tabari (d. 923) and al-Baladhuri (d. 892), both citing al-Waqidi (d. 823), held that Junada led a wide-scale sea raid against Rhodes in 672 or 673. The historian al-Ya'qubi (d. 898), on the other hand, held that Junada raided Tarsus that year. Al-Tabari and Khalifa ibn Khayyat (d. 854) both attribute command of the winter campaign against the Arab–Byzantine frontier in 675/76 to Junada. He is credited for leading two more naval campaigns against Rhodes in 678/79 and 679/80.

Junada was held by al-Tabari to have established a permanent Arab garrison in Rhodes, but the colony was frequently blockaded and harassed by Byzantine ships. The garrison remained on the island until the accession of Mu'awiya I's son and successor, Yazid I (r. 680–683), who ordered the Arabs' withdrawal to Syria. The modern historian Lawrence Conrad has dismissed the 670s Arab occupation of Rhodes as a literary artifice by the early Islamic tradition. C. E. Bosworth has also dismissed the episode, in particular the implication that Junada continuously resided on the island during the supposed seven-year duration of the Arab presence as he is mentioned leading land and sea campaigns against Byzantine Anatolia throughout the 670s. The historian Marek Jankowiak has argued that "there are no grounds to reject" Junada's occupation of Rhodes.

== Bibliography ==
- Bewley, Aisha (1997). The Men of Madina, Volume One by Muhammad Ibn Sa'd. London: Ta-Ha Publishers. ISBN 1-897940-68-8.
- Bosworth, C. Edmund (July 1996). "Arab Attacks on Rhodes in the Pre-Ottoman Period". Journal of the Royal Asiatic Society. 6 (2): 157–164. doi:10.1017/S1356186300007161. JSTOR 25183178.
- Conrad, Lawrence I. (1992). "The Conquest of Arwad: A Source-Critical Study in the Historiography of the Early Medieval Near East". The Byzantine and Early Islamic Near East. 1: 317–402.
- Jankowiak, Marek (2013). "The First Arab Siege of Constantinople". In Zuckerman, Constantin (ed.). Travaux et mémoires, Vol. 17: Constructing the Seventh Century. Paris: Association des Amis du Centre d’Histoire et Civilisation de Byzance. pp. 237–320.
- Landau-Tasseron, Ella, ed. (1998). The History of al-Ṭabarī, Volume XXXIX: Biographies of the Prophet's Companions and their Successors: al-Ṭabarī's Supplement to his History. SUNY Series in Near Eastern Studies. Albany, New York: State University of New York Press. ISBN 978-0-7914-2819-1.
- Ulrich, Brian (2019). Arabs in the Early Islamic Empire: Exploring al-Azd Tribal Identity. Edinburgh: Edinburgh University Press. ISBN 978-1-4744-3682-3.
