= Sitt al-Wuzara' al-Tanukhiyyah =

14th-century Syrian hadith scholar

- Died: 716/1338 C.E.
- Occupation: Scholar

Sitt al-Wuzara' al-Tanukhiyyah (died 716/1338 C.E.) was a Syrian hadith scholar. She was the last student of Husayn ibn al-Mubarak al-Zabidi and Abu al-Munajja Ibn al-Latti. Alongside with her prominent predecessors -Umm al-Darda and Fatima bint 'Abd al- Malik ibn Marwan, wife of the pious caliph 'Umar ibn 'Abd al-'Aziz, she represents what Mohammad Akram Nadwi terms as hadith scholarship from al-Sham (Greater Syria).

== The honorable title 'Sitt' ==
The Arabic word sitt does not signify the personal name. It means a respectful greeting usually attributed to the female rulers or to women with some exceptional talents in the sciences. For example, queen of the Fatimid dynasty of Egypt in 980 bore the title Sitt al-Mulk. Sitt al-Qudat (literally, chief of qadis, or judge) was a female expert in hadith and fiqh, and lived in Damascus in 14th century. Also, Sitt al-'Arab an Sitt al-'Ajam other eminent experts in hadiths lived in the same century.

Apropos, in another source she is called with a longer name Sitt al-Wuzara' bint 'Umar ibn al-Munajja that means she is a daughter of 'Umar who is son of al-Munajja.

== Scholarship ==
An exceptional devotion, steadfastness and stamina in the teaching has been exercised by Sitt al-Wuzara. She was widely known in Damascus for teaching Sahih Al-Bukhari, the authentic collection of the hadiths (included over 7000 hadiths unanimously accepted by Muslim scholars of his time). Evidence of her high role in narrating hadiths is shown in the main title on the ornamented title page of Sahih al-Bukhari (dated 8th century), which stated that narration of al-Firabri, the isnad (the chain of the transmitters of the hadiths) of Sitt al-Wuzara'. The narrator heard the chain of the transmitters along with the hadiths from Sitt al-Wuzara'.

Nadwi in Al-Muhaddithat: the Women Scholars in Islam underlined an interesting coincidence regarding Sitt al-Wuzara' that she was the last woman in the world who had narrated the hadiths from Sahih Al-Bukhari from Al-Zadibi and died in 716 and Aishah bint Muhammad ibn 'Abd al-Hadi al-Maqdisiyyah, who died one hundred years later, had even above this quality that even among men no one reached this level.

== Legacy ==
Sitt al-Wuzara' is known for having taught many students over her life, both regular citizens and nobles. She lived more than ninety years. Islamic scholar Ibn Kathir reported she was teaching until the last breath, the last day of her long life.
