= Abla al-Kahlawi =

Egyptian Islamic scholar and teacher (1948–2021)

Abla al-Kahlawi (15 December 1948 – 25 January 2021) was an Egyptian scholar and teacher of Islamic jurisprudence, as well as a religious leader, preacher, and television presenter. She taught at Al Azhar University in Cairo, Egypt, where she was the Dean of the Faculty of Islamic and Arabic Studies at the Women's College. She was listed on the inaugural edition of The 500 Most Influential Muslims for her work on religion and women, in 2009, and has published widely on women and Islamic jurisprudence. She preached in Egypt, in person and on television, as well as in Saudi Arabia, and notably preached every day for two years at the Masjid al-Ḥaram, Islam's most important mosque in Saudi Arabia, between 1987 and 1989.

== Life ==
Abla al-Kahlawi was born on 15 December 1948, in Egypt. Her father, Mohammed al-Kahlawi was a famous nausheed artist. She died at the age of 72, of COVID-19.

== Career ==
Al-Kahlawi studied Islamic law at Al-Azhar University, in Cairo, Egypt earning a master's degree in 1974 and a doctorate in 1978 in the field. In 1979, she was appointed the Dean of the Sharia Department at the Faculty of Education in the Women's College in Mecca. She was later appointed Dean of Islamic and Arabic Studies at the Women's College of Al-Azhar University. She also taught at the College for Education for Girls in Riyadh in Saudi Arabia.

From 1987 to 1989, al-Kahlawi preached daily at the Masjid al-Haram, Islam's most important mosque, located in Saudi Arabia. Her lessons were attended by female pilgrims from around the world. She continued to preach for women in Egypt thereafter, at a number of famous mosques including Al-Azhar Mosque, al- Hamd, and Al-Hossari, as well as at a mosque established by her father, at prayers that were widely attended. She also presented a number of regional religious programs that were widely viewed, and was known popularly to her audience as 'Mama Abla'. Al-Kahlawi's lectures consisted of discourses on Islamic law and principles, the explanation of religious texts, and answering questions on jurisprudence. According to the Oxford Encyclopedia of Islam and Women, her scholarship and preaching "....critique the misogynistic interpretation of Islamic texts and attempt to curtail tendencies toward extremism," while also advocating for women's rights in divorce, and encouraging the values of "...tolerance, moderation, compassion, and peace."

In 2009, she was listed as one of The 500 Most Influential Muslims, which was the first edition of an annual list created by the Royal Islamic Strategic Studies Centre in Jordan, and issued annually in cooperation with Prince Al-Waleed Bin Talal Center for Muslim-Christian Understanding at Georgetown University in the United States. The list cited her as a "...senior authority on issues of specific concern to women, and the head of one of the most well respected centers for Muslim women’s scholarship in the world." She is described by the Oxford Encyclopedia of Islam and Women as "... among the most famous female ulamā (Islamic scholars) in the Arab World."

In 2006, she was one of a group of 41 prominent Islamic leaders and scholars who wrote to condemn the violence that followed the Jyllands-Posten Muhammad cartoons controversy, while simultaneously abjuring the cartoons themselves. She was one of the signatories to A Common Word Between Us and You, an open letter sent by leaders of the Islamic religion to leaders of Christianity, calling for peace between the two religions. Her work in preaching was recognized by Entissar Amer, the first lady of Egypt, who described her career as an "....honorable and remarkable march on the road of charity and preaching."

In Egypt, al-Kahlawi established a significant charitable organization in Mokattam, Cairo, to provide aid to orphans, as well as persons suffering from cancer and Alzheimer's disease.

== Publications ==
Al-Kahlawy has written several notable books on Islamic jurisprudence. These include:

- Faʿlyat al-Zakāt fi Himayat al-Iqtisad wa al-Tanmiya (The Importance of Alms in Securing Economy and Development, 1996)
- Al-Marā bayn Tahārat al- Bātin wa al- Zāhir (Women: The Inside and Outside Sanctity, 1997)
- Qadāy al- Marʾa fi al-Ḥajj wa-al-ʿUmrā (Women's Issues in the Hajj and ʿUmrah, 2005)
