= Umm al-Darda =

Companion (Sahabiyyah) of Muhammad

Umm al-Darda (Arabic: أُمّ الدَّرْدَاءِ, romanized: ʾUmm al-Dardāʾ) was a companion of the Islamic prophet Muhammad. She was a prominent jurist in 7th century Damascus.

The 5th Umayyad caliph, Abd al-Malik ibn Marwan, was Umm al-Darda's student with whom he studied fiqh.

== See also ==
- Hafsa bint Sirin
- Umm al-Darda as-Sughra
