= Mahrouna =

Town in South Governorate, Lebanon

Mahrouna محرونة
- Municipality
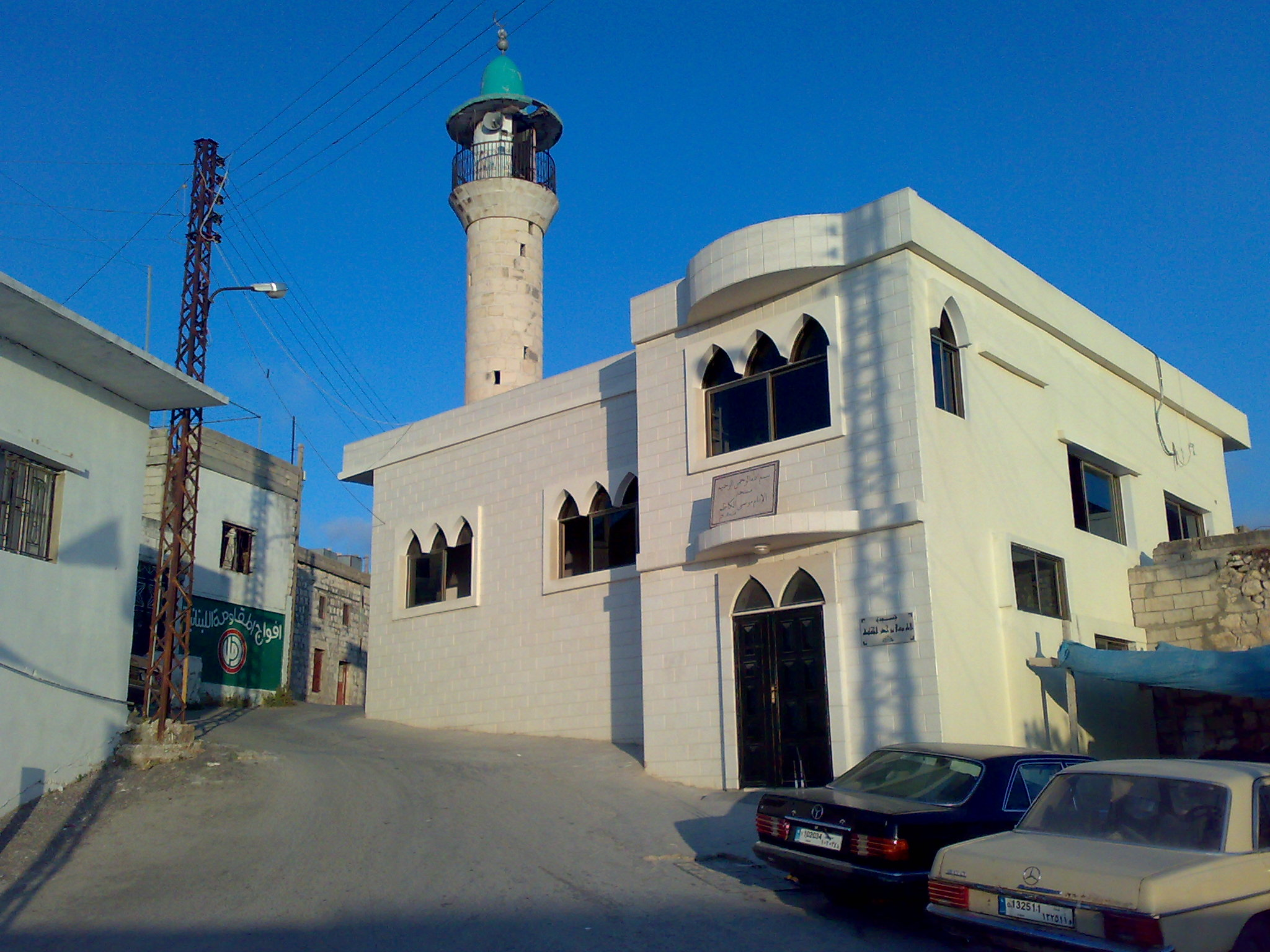
- Mahrouna Mosque in 2008

- Location within Lebanon
- Coordinates: 33°13′8.25″N 35°20′33.92″E
- Grid position: 182/291 PAL
- Country: Lebanon
- Governorate: South Governorate
- District: Tyre

Area
  - Total: 12.65 km^{2} (4.88 sq mi)
- Elevation: 400 m (1,300 ft)

Population (2014)
  - Total: 3,800
  - Density: 300/km^{2} (780/sq mi)
- (Note: Estimate, based on 2014 voter registration data and demographic assumptions.)
- Time zone: +2
  - Summer (DST): +3
- Postal code: 00961

Mahrouna (Arabic: محرونة, romanized: Maḥrūnah) is a municipality in the Tyre District of the South Governorate in southern Lebanon. Located approximately 100 km south of Beirut and 18 km southeast of Tyre, the town sits at an elevation of 400 m above sea level. The only official demographic data available is from the 2014 voter registration records, which list 1,133 registered voters. The population is estimated around 3,800 residents.

== Etymology ==
British orientalist E. H. Palmer suggested the name Mahrûneh derives from the Arabic term for "'carded' (as cotton)."

== History ==
In 1875, French archaeologist Victor Guérin documented Mahrouna as a village inhabited by metawileh (Shia Muslims), noting ancient structural remains, rock-cut tombs, quarries, and a repurposed stone tank. The 1881 Survey of Western Palestine described it as a stone-built village of approximately 150 metawileh residents, surrounded by olive groves, fig trees, and farmland, with access to a spring and cisterns.

A prominent feature of the area is a hill covered in oak and olive trees, which functions as a natural park. The site includes ancient ruins, with large squared stones forming sections of a wall. Local tradition holds these remains to be part of a former fortress. During conflicts in the late 20th and early 21st centuries, including the 2006 Lebanon War, portions of the hill sustained damage from aerial bombardments by Israeli jets, resulting in the destruction of oak trees.

Mahrouna was designated a municipality in 2004, with a nine-member council elected for a six-year term. Kamal Wehbe served as its inaugural president. As of 2011, the municipality managed local services under the oversight of Lebanon’s central government.

On 6 November 2024, during the Israeli invasion of Lebanon, the Mahrouna Mosque was destroyed by an Israeli airstrike.

== Demographics ==
According to 2014 voter registration data from Lebanon's Ministry of Interior and Municipalities, Mahrouna had 1,133 registered voters. Of these, 99.12% identified as Muslim, with Shia Muslims comprising 98.53%. Common family names include Wehbe (432 registered voters), Nehme (163), Shorba (91), Awada (47), and Makki (45).

== Notable people ==
- Haifa Wehbe (born 1976): Lebanese singer, actress and former beauty pageant titleholder. She was crowned Miss South Lebanon in 1992, and was first runner-up in Miss Lebanon 1996.

== Gallery ==
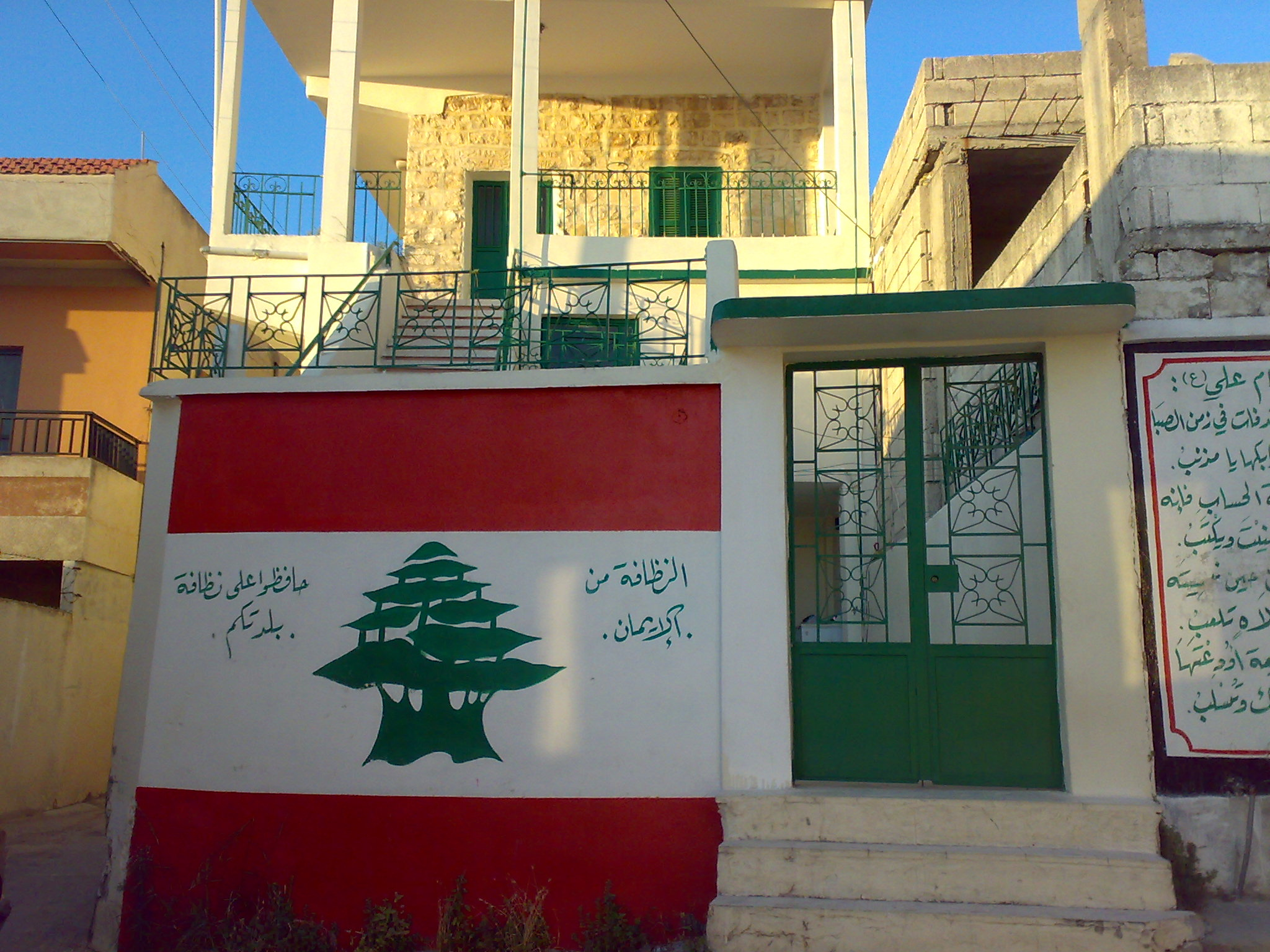
Old Town House

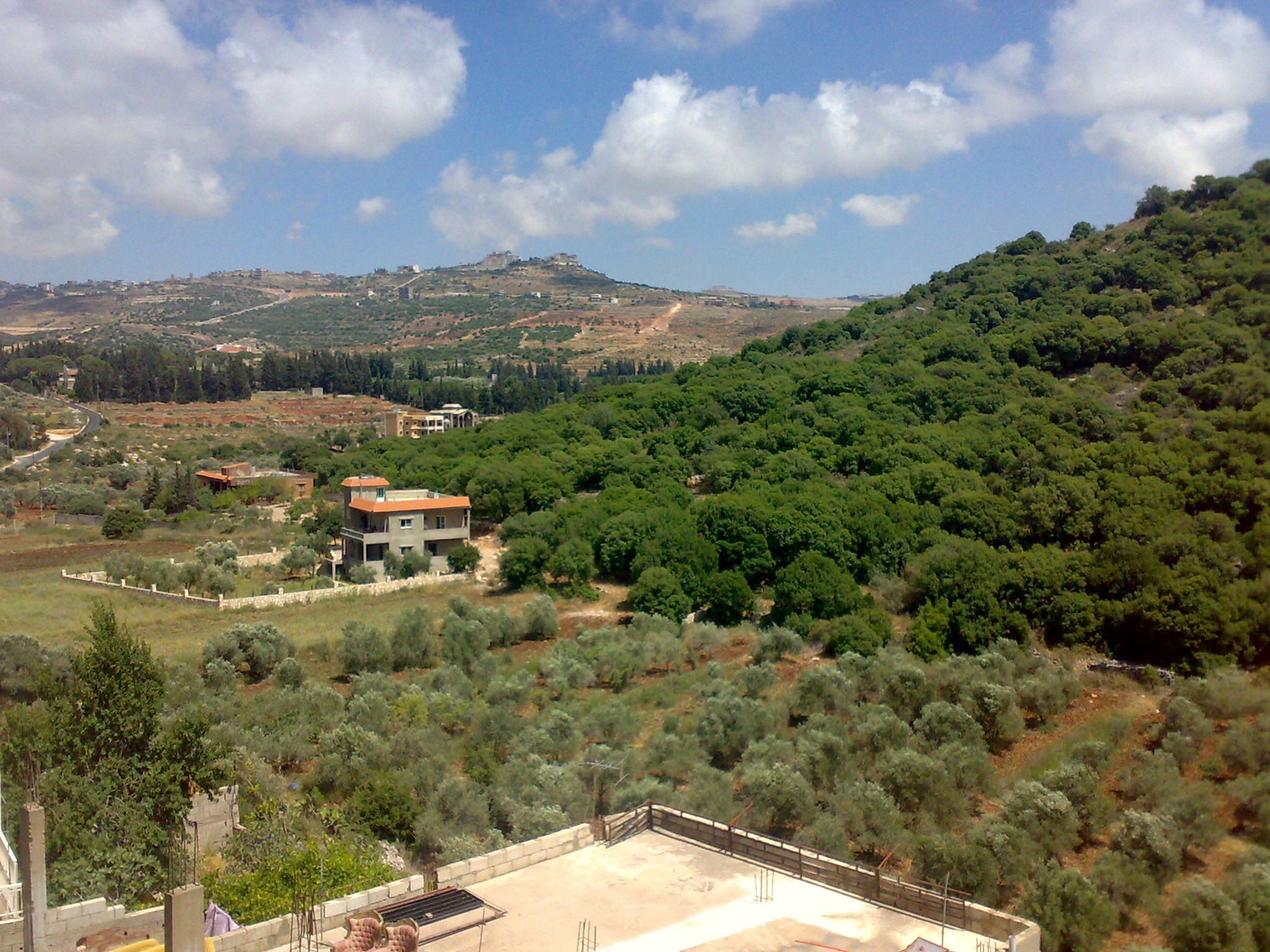
Town's Green View

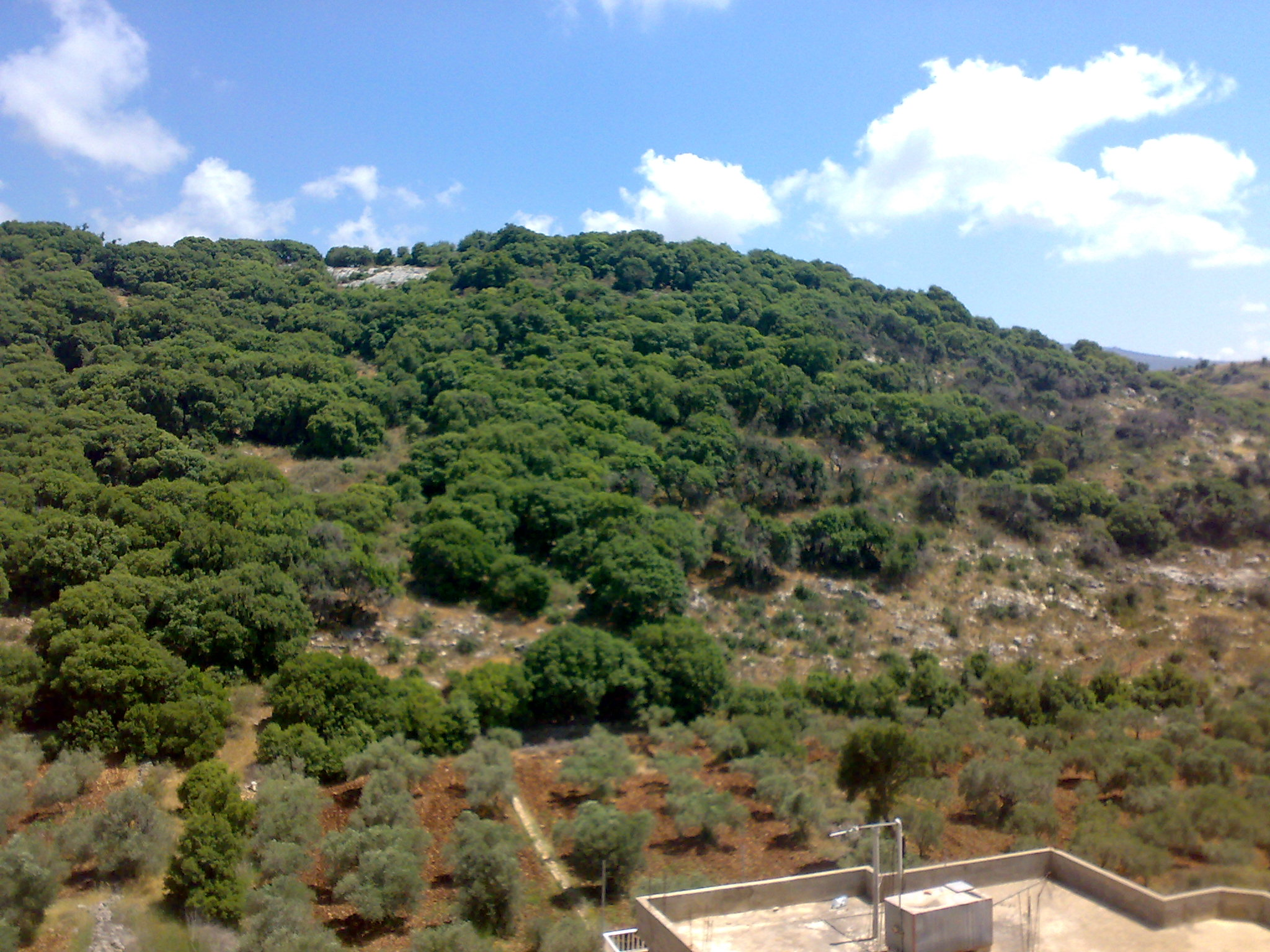
Oak Tree Hill

== Bibliography ==
- Conder, C.R.; Kitchener, H.H. (1881). The Survey of Western Palestine: Memoirs of the Topography, Orography, Hydrography, and Archaeology. Vol. 1. London: Committee of the Palestine Exploration Fund.
- Guérin, V. (1880). Description Géographique Historique et Archéologique de la Palestine (in French). Vol. 3: Galilee, pt. 2. Paris: L'Imprimerie Nationale.
- Palmer, E.H. (1881). The Survey of Western Palestine: Arabic and English Name Lists Collected During the Survey by Lieutenants Conder and Kitchener, R. E. Transliterated and Explained by E.H. Palmer. Committee of the Palestine Exploration Fund.

== Sources ==
- تعرف على بلدة محرونة الجنوبية [Learn about the southern town of Mahrouna] (Video) (in Arabic). Mahrouna news. 26 October 2021.
- Ministry of Interior and Municipalities
