= Abu al-Qasim al-Ansari =

Islamic scholar (1040–1118)

Abu al-Qasim al-Ansari أبو القاسم الأنصاري
- Title: Nasir al-Sunnah; Sayf al-Nazr

Personal life
- Born: 1040 Arghiyān near Nishapur
- Died: October 10, 1118 (aged 77–78) Unknown; presumably in or near Nishapur
- Era: Abbasid Caliphate
- Main interest(s): Islamic theology, Hadith, Islamic jurisprudence, Tafsir, Sufism, Usul al-Din
- Notable work: Al-Ghunya fi al-Kalam
- Occupation: Muhaddith, Mufassir, Scholar, Muslim Jurist, Theologian, Mystic

Religious life
- Religion: Islam
- Denomination: Sunni
- Jurisprudence: Shafi'i
- Creed: Ash'ari

Muslim leader
- Influenced by: Al-Shafi'i Abu Hasan al-Ash'ari Al-Qushayri Al-Juwayni Abd al-Ghafir al-Farsi
- Influenced: Al-Shahrastani Ibn al-Sam'ani Diya' al-Din al-Makki

Abū l-Qāsim Salmān b. Nāṣir b. 'Imrān al-Anṣārī al-Arghiyānī al-Nīsābūrī al-Ṣūfī al-Shāfi'ī (Arabic: أبو القاسم الأنصاري), commonly known as Abu al-Qasim al-Ansari, was an Arab Ash'arite theologian, Shafi'i jurist, traditionist, scriptural exegete and mystic during the Islamic Golden Age. He was the famous pupil of Imam al-Haramayn al-Juwayni and greatly influenced by him, as can be seen by his own theological writings. He was referred to as Sayf al-Nazr (Arabic: سيف النظر, lit. '"Sword of insight"').

As a Muslim scholar of the Sunni branch and Shafi'i school, his studies covered the fields of Islamic theology, Usul al-Din (principles of faith), Shafi'i jurisprudence, Sufism, Interpretation of Quran, and the studies of Hadith. Among his most prominent students were Al-Shahrastani, the author of Al-Milal wa al-Nihal, and Ibn al-Sam'ani, the author of Kitab al-Ansab. He lived under the Abbasid Caliphate, between the second half of the fifth century AH and beginning of the sixth century AH of the Islamic calendar.

== Name ==
Al-Ansari's full name was "Salman bin Nasser bin Imran bin Muhammad bin Ismail bin Ishaq bin Yazid bin Ziyad bin Maymoon bin Mahran, Abu al-Qasim, Ansari al-Nisaburi". Some of those who translated Al-Ansari disagreed with this designation, instead used "Suleiman" in the place of "Salman". Perhaps this is due to a misrepresentation in the copies of the books in which it was mentioned that he was named after Solomon. Due to the large number of people who called him "Salman" from those who translated for him, as well as the closeness of the two names in form, the two names were mixed up during the translation. There is an anecdote that confirms his name to be Salman from records of Ibn Qadi Shahba (Arabic: ابن قاضي شهبة), in which it was mentioned that al-Ansari personally corrected his name in the sentence: "Salman opened the Seine" (Arabic: سلمان بفتح السين).

== Life ==
Al-Ansari grew up in a town on the outskirts of Nishapur of Transoxiana, which is located in the northeastern part of modern-day Iran. At the time the area was under the control of the Seljuk Empire. In his early age, Al-Ansari spent time under the apprenticeship to Fadlallah Al-Mehani (Arabic: فضل الله الميهني), the then Sheikh of Khorasan. Al-Ansari was among those whom he narrated the hadith to on the authority of Zaher bin Ahmed Al-Sarkhasi (Arabic: زاهر بن أحمد السرخسي).

Around 465 AH (1073 CE), Abu al-Qasim studied in Nishapur under some of the foremost leading scholars of his day. After completing his studies, he visited Baghdad and went to Hajj. He migrated to Levant, and visited the graves of Islamic prophets. He kept an ascetic and pious lifestyle during his travels and studies.

== Teachers ==
Al-Ansari also spent time serving and learning from the following scholars:

- Al-Qushayri (Arabic: القشيري), a Sufi polymath. He taught Al-Ansari Tasawwuf where he became a Sufi disciple.
- Al-Juwayni (Arabic: أبو المعالي الجويني), a Persian Islamic theologian and jurist titled Imam al Haramayn (lit "leading master of the two holy cities"). He lectured Al-Ansari on discourse. Later Al-Ansari quoted extensively from Al-Juwayni.
- Abd al-Ghafir al-Farsi (Arabic: عبد الغافر الفارسي), hadith scholar, grammarian, and a compiler of Nishapur history.
- Abu al-Hasan ibn Makki (Arabic: أبو الحسن ابن مكي), whom Al-Ansari came across in Damascus and learned hadith narration from.
- Karima al-Marwaziyya (Arabic: كريمة المروزية), the author of the narration on the authority of Muhammad al-Bukhari.

== Pupils ==
Some of the most notable individuals among his students were:

- Al-Shahrastani (Arabic: أبو الفتح الشهرستاني), the author of Nihāyat al-aqdām fī 'ilm al-kalām (The End of Steps in the Science of Theology) and Kitāb al–Milal wa al-Nihal (The Book of Sects and Creeds).
- Ibn al-Sam'ani (Arabic: أبو سعد السمعاني), the author of Kitab al-Ansab.
- Ḍiyāʾ al-Dīn al-Makkī (Arabic: ضياء الدين أبو القاسم الرازي), the author of Ghayat al-Maram and the father of Fakhr al-Din al-Razi.
- Abu Al-Fath al-Ansari al-Nisaburi (Arabic: ابنه أبو الفتح الأنصاري النيسابوري), Al-Ansari's own son and a diplomat under the Sultan Ahmad Sanjar.

== Death ==
Around the last few years of his life, Al-Ansari suffered from poor eyesight and tinnitus. The majority of those who translated for him agreed that his death was in the year 512 AH (1118 CE). Some of the sources specified that he died in the month of Jumada II (the 6th month of the Islamic calendar). In contrary, a number of accounts, such as the ones made by Al-Dhahabi, Al-Suyuti and Ahmed bin Muhammad al-Adnroy (Arabic: أحمد بن محمد الأدنروي) claimed that Al-Ansari died in the year 511 AH (1117 CE) instead.

== His studies ==
Al-Ansari had compiled materials from several imams concerning the Usul al-Din (principles of faith). In his work Al-Ghaniat fi al-Kalam and Al-Ghaniyaa Dariyyah, he also weighted the authenticity of many hadiths, including the ones on:

- Inference to the world event;
- The eternity of divine attributes;
- The invalidity of the sayings of Al-Dahriya, who said that the world was old;
- Prohibition of contemplating Allah and commanding contemplation of his creatures;
- Prohibition of saying that Allah is equal with other deities.

Out of the hadiths that Al-Ansari examined in the theology section of his book Al-Ghaniyaa Dariyyah, he said that 88 hadiths can be attributed to Muhammad, and 44 were sayings from the companions and followers of Muhammad.

== Works ==
- Al-Ghaniat fi al-kalam (Arabic: الغنية في الكلام, lit. '"Rich in Speech"')
- Sharh al-Irshad (Arabic: شرح الإرشاد, lit. 'Explanation of the Extension')
- Sharh al-Ghaniat fi Furue al-Shaafieiat Liabn Sirij (Arabic: شرح الغنية في فروع الشافعية لابن سريج, lit. 'Explanation of the rich in the branches of Shafi'i by Ibn Surayj'), which was attributed to Al-Ansari by Ḥājjī Khalīfa in Kashf al-Zunun
- Kitab al-Taharat fi al-Fiqh (Arabic: كتاب الطهارات في الفقه, lit. 'the Book of Puridications in Jurisprudence')
- Kitab al-Dahaya (Arabic: كتاب الضحايا, lit. 'Book of Victims')
- Kitab fi al-Tafsir (Arabic: كتاب في التفسير, lit. 'Book of Interpretation')

== See also ==
- List of Ash'aris
- List of Muslim theologians
