= Wahbi =

Wahbi or Wahby may refer to:

== People ==
=== Given name ===
- 'Atika Wahbi al-Khazraji (1924–1997), Iraqi poet and educator
- Mustafa Wahbi Tal (1899–1944), Jordanian poet, writer, teacher and civil servan
- Wahbi al-Bouri (1016–2010), Libyan politician, diplomat, writer and translator
- Wahbi al-Hariri (1914–1994), Syrian American artist, architect, archaeologist, and author
- Wahbi Khazri (born 1991), French footballer
- Wahbi Sulayman Ghawji (1923–2013), Albanian Muslim scholar

=== Surname ===
- Abdel Moneim Wahby (1911–1988), Egyptian basketball player
- Amin Wahbi (born 1952), Lebanese politician
- Kenza Wahbi (born 1971), Moroccan long-distance runner
- Taufiq Wahby (1891–1984), Kurdish writer, linguist and politician
- Youssef Wahbi (1902–1982), Egyptian film director and actor

== Other ==
- Wahbi school, a school of thought in Ibadi Islam
- Wahbi nukkar, branch of Wahbi school of thought
- Wahbi (Sanaa), subdistrict in Yemen

== See also ==
- Wehbe
