= Najm al-Din al-Qazwini al-Katibi =

13th-century Medieval Persian Islamic scholar

Najm al-Dīn 'Alī ibn 'Umar al-Qazwīnī al-Kātibī (Persian: نجم‌الدین القزوینی الکاتبی; born AH 600 / 1204 CE, died AH 675 / 1276 CE) was a Persian Islamic philosopher and logician of the Shafi`i school. He was a student of Athīr al-Dīn al-Abharī. His most important works are a treatise on logic, Al-Risala al-Shamsiyya, and one on metaphysics and the natural sciences, Hikmat al-'Ain. Further, he helped to establish the Maragha observatory along with Nasir al-Din al-Tusi and several other astronomers.

== Logic ==
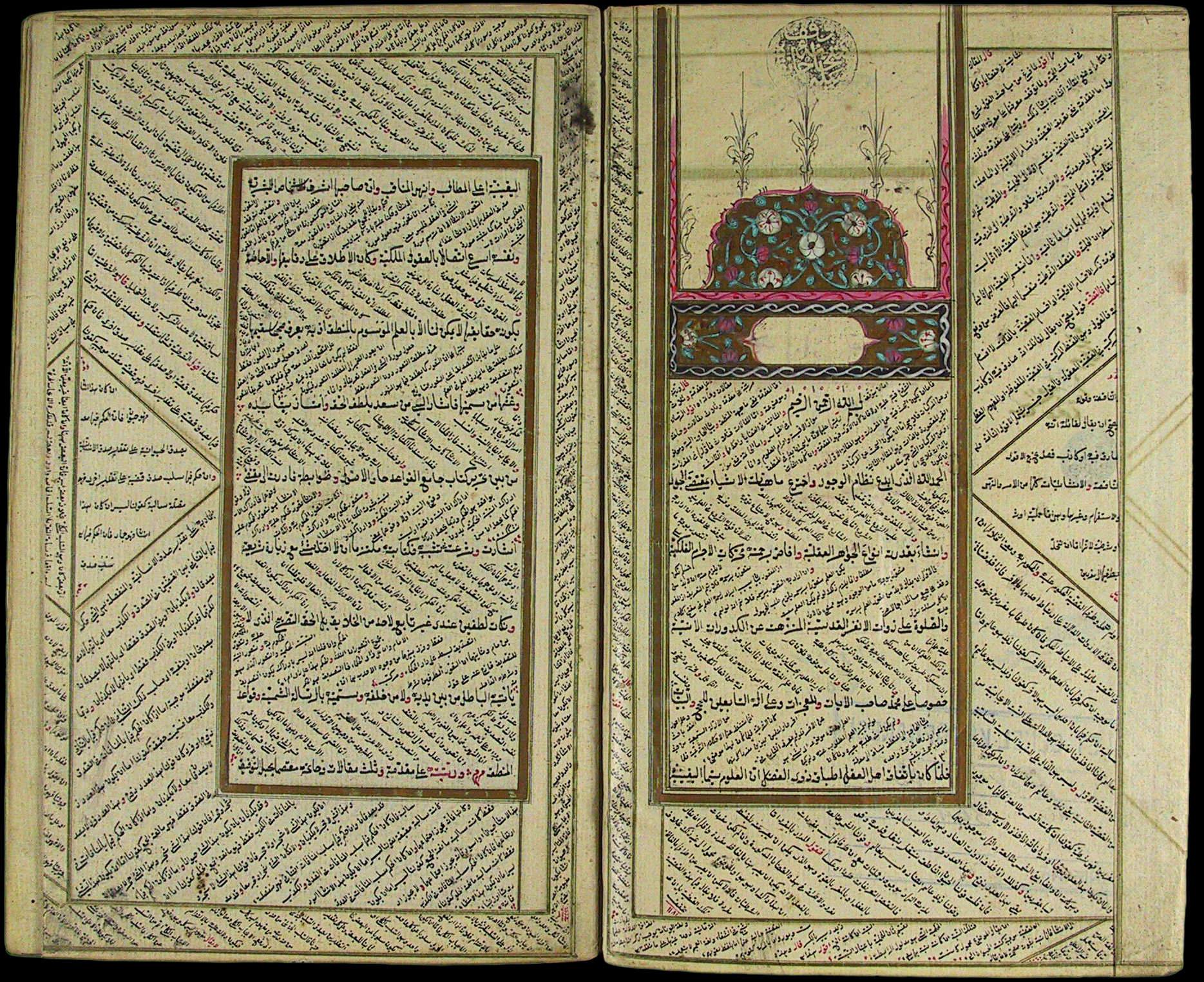
18th century manuscript copy of al-Risāla al-Shamsiyya (Istanbul, Süleymaniye Library man. Pertev Paşa 364)

His work on logic, the al-Risāla al-Shamsiyya (Logic for Shams al-Dīn), was commonly used as the first major text on logic in madrasahs, right down until the twentieth century and is "perhaps the most studied logic textbook of all time". Al-Katibi's logic was largely inspired by the formal Avicennian system of temporal modal logic, but is more elaborate and departs from it in several ways. While Avicenna considered ten modalities and examined six of them, al-Katibi considers many more modalized propositions and examines thirteen which he considers 'customary to investigate'.

Al-Katibi's other major work, Philosophy of the Source, is a treatise about physics and metaphysics.

Under the title The Rules of Logic, a bilingual Arabic edition and English translation of this text was published in 2024 by the Library of Arabic Literature, edited and translated by Tony Street of the Faculty of Divinity at the University of Cambridge.

== See also ==
- Logic in Islamic philosophy
- Avicennian logic

== Sources ==
- Leaman, Oliver; Nasr, Seyyed Hossein (2013). History of Islamic Philosophy. Taylor & Francis. ISBN 9781136780448.
