= Athir al-Din al-Abhari =

Iranian philosopher, astronomer, astrologer and mathematician

Al-Abharī
- Died: 1262–1265; Mosul

Academic background
- Influences: Kamāl al-Dīn ibn Yūnus, Fakhr al-Dīn al-Rāzī, Kūshyār ibn Labbān, Jābir ibn Aflaḥ

Academic work
- Era: Islamic Golden Age
- School or tradition: Sunni Ashari
- Main interests: Astronomy, Mathematics, Philosophy, Islam
- Influenced: Ibn Khallikān, al-Kātibī, al-Iṣfahānī, al-Samarqandī, al-Qazwīnī, Naṣīr al-Dīn al-Ṭūsī.

Athīr al-Dīn al-Mufaḍḍal ibn ʿUmar ibn al-Mufaḍḍal al-Samarqandī al-Abharī (Persian): اثیرالدین مُفَضَّل بن عمر بن مَفَضَّل سمرقندی ابهری; d. 1262 or 1265 also known as Athīr al-Dīn al-Munajjim (اثیرالدین منجم) was an Iranian Muslim polymath, philosopher, astronomer, astrologer and mathematician. Other than his influential writings, he had many disciples.

== Life ==
His birthplace is contested among sources. According to the Encyclopaedia of Islam and the Encyclopaedia Islamica, he was born in Abhar, a small town between Qazvin and Zanjan in the North-West of Iran. The claim of G.C. Anawati making him a native of Mosul in Iraq, taken from the fact that al-Abharī was educated by a scientist from Mosul, Kamāl al-Dīn ibn Yūnus al-Mawṣilī, must also been dismissed. None of his oldest biographers mentioned Mosul as his birthplace, and al-Abharī himself indicated that he had gone to Mosul for this purpose. Beside the city of Abhar, the epithet al-Abharī could suggest that he or his ancestors originally stem from the Abhar tribe.

In his youth al-Abharī was a student of the theologian Fakhr al-Dīn al-Rāzī, probably in the city of Ghazni or Herat. Beside philosophy and logic, from al-Rāzī it is likely that al-Abharī received an orthodox Sunni instruction in theology (kalām), jurisprudence (fiqh), and Qur’anic exegesis (tafsīr). When Mongol took Khwarezmian Empire, al-Abharī, in 1228 he flew to Erbil, then to Damascus, where he studied to Muḥyī al-Dīn Muḥammad b. Sa‘īd b. Nadī. Then he went to Mosul, where he studied mathematics, especially astronomy, under the direction of Kamāl al-Dīn al-Mawṣilī.

Among his students were Najm al-Din al-Qazwini al-Katibi, Abū Zakariya al-Qazwini, and Ibn Khallikān.

According to most accounts, al-Abharī died in Mosul between 660/1261–62 and 663/1264–65, during the reign of Khān Hülegü.

== Works ==
Astronomy

- Risāla fī al-hayʾa (رساله الهیئة; lit. Treatise on astronomy).
- Mukhtaṣar fī al-hayʾa (مختصر فی علم الهیئة; lit. Epitome on astronomy).
- Kashf al-ḥaqāʾiq fī taḥrīr al-daqāʾiq (كشف الحقائق فی تحریر الدقائق), where he accepts the view that the celestial bodies do not change and maintains that stars have volition and it is the source of their motion.

Mathematics

- Several works on Iṣlāḥ (اصلاح; lit. Correction) of Euclid, one of which is an attempt to prove the parallel postulate, which was commented upon and criticized by Shams al-Dīn al-Samarqandī.

Philosophy

- Hidāyah al-Hikmah (هدایةالحکمه; lit. Guide on Philosophy): a book dealing with the complete cycle of Hikmat, i.e., logic, natural philosophy, and metaphysics.
- Isāghūjī fi al-Manṭiq (ایساغوجی فی المنطق; Commentary on Porphyry's Isagoge), a treatise on logic. Latin Translation by Thomas Obicini; Īsāghūkhī, Isagoge. Id est, breve Introductorium Arabicum in Scientiam Logices: cum versione latina: ac theses Sanctae Fidei. R. P. F. Thomae Novariensis (1625).
