= Al-Isharat wa al-Tanbihat =

Book by Avicenna

Al-Isharat wa’l-tanbihat (Arabic: الإشارات والتنبيهات, "The Book of Directives and Remarks") is apparently one of the last books of Avicenna which is written in Arabic.

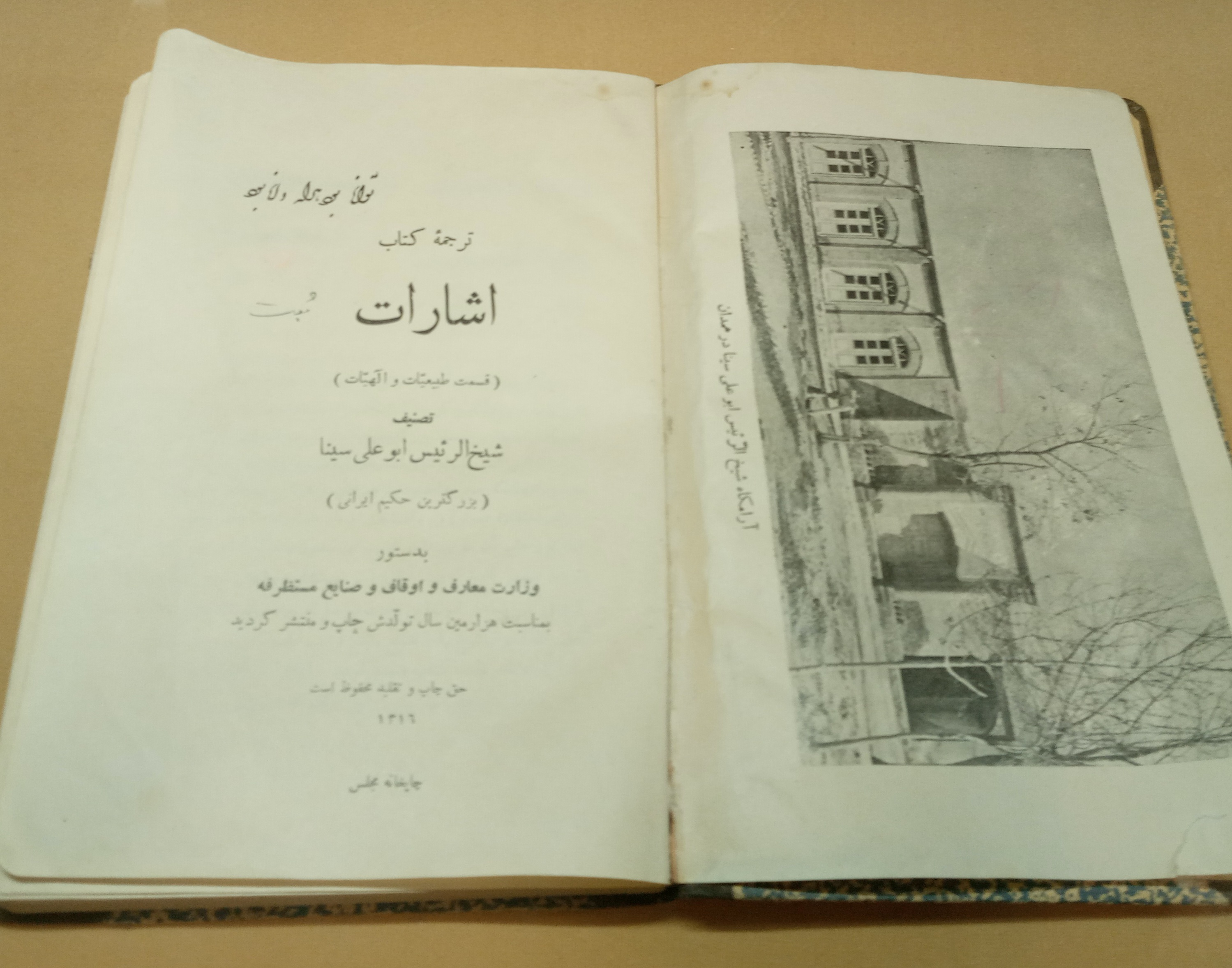

== Author ==
Avicenna was born in Afsanah at 980, a village near Bukhara (now in present-day Uzbekistan). His father counted as ruler of a region by the name of keramaytan. Avicenna along with his family after moving to Bukhara, continued his studies. According to Nasr, Avicenna had many teachers including Nātelī physicians Abū Manṣūr Qomrī and Abū Sahl Masīḥī. Avicenna wrote nearly 250 works on diverse sciences in medieval period including long and short treatises such as the Daneshnameh Alaei (The Book of Science Dedicated to 'Alii' al-Dawlah). Avicenna wrote Isharat when he was under the criticism of certain literary scholars, showing his skill in Arabic language by a philosophy book as Isharat. Nasr refers to the book of Isharat as the last and greatest masterpiece of Avicenna.

== Content ==
Isharat described as a comprehensive and mature book by Avicenna. This book is divided wholly into two parts. The first part is about logic, which in turn is divided into ten subparts. The second part is about philosophy, which is in turn is divided into ten subparts. Avicenna himself calls the subparts of logic “Nahj” or style and the philosophy part “Namat.” Inanti divided it to four parts: logic, physics, metaphysics and Sufism. The titles of Al Isharat are drawn from the titles of the majority of chapters in the whole work.

=== Title of book ===
The word “Isharat” is a synonym for signs, remarks, indications and hints. Also “Tanbihat” is a synonym for words such as admonitions, warnings and caution. According to Inati, Isharat signifies Avicenna’s own views. In other words, when Ibn Sina refers to Isharah, he shows his opinion. When he refers to Tanbihat, he shows the faults of other philosophers in a subject. Sometimes Avicenna refers to Isharah by words like A follow-up, a closing comment and wish. Also he refers to Tanbiha by a word like delusion.

== Characters ==
Ibn Sina wrote the book in such a way that only philosophers can understand it. Avicenna himself points out that this book is not suitable for non-philosophers.

== Commentaries ==
Many commentaries have been written on this book. The most famous ones are Nasir al-Din al-Tusi Tusi (Sharh al-isharat) and Imam Fakhr Razi’s and an explanation and description by Allame Hassan Hasanzadeh Amoli.

== Translations ==
This book has been translated into Persian, English, and other languages. Shams Inati has translated it into English.

== Resources ==
- Inati, Shams (1996). Ibn Sīnā and Mysticism: Remarks and Admonitions, Part Four. Kegan Paul International. ISBN 978-0-7103-0482-7.
- Salavati, Abdullah (1962). sharh Isharat va tanbihat in Persian. Vol. 2. mirror of heritage (Ayneh Mirath).
