= Diya' al-Din al-Makki =

12th-century Islamic scholar

Ḍiyāʾ al-Dīn al-Makkī ضياء الدين المالكي
- Title: Ḍiyāʾ al-Dīn

Personal life
- Died: 550 AH/1155-6 CE
- Region: Middle East
- Main interest(s): Islamic theology (kalam), Islamic jurisprudence
- Notable work: Nihayat al-Maram fi Dirayat al-Kalam
- Occupation: Jurist, Scholar, Islamic Theologian

Religious life
- Religion: Islam
- Denomination: Sunni
- Jurisprudence: Shafi'i
- Creed: Ash'ari

Muslim leader
- Influenced by: Al-Shafi'i Abu al-Hasan al-Ash'ari Abu al-Qasim al-Ansari al-Baghawi
- Influenced: Fakhr al-Din al-Razi

Ḍiyāʾ al-Dīn ʿUmar b. al-Ḥusayn al-Makkī, also known as Ḍiyāʾ al-Dīn al-Makkī (Arabic: ضياء الدين المالكي) was a well-known Ash'arite theologian and Shafi'i jurist. His primary distinction is that he was the father and the first teacher of Fakhr al-Din al-Razi, one of the most significant theologians and philosophers in Islamic history.

== Name ==
His name Makki is rooted from his family background who left Mecca and migrated first to Tabaristan and from there they settled the nearby city of Rey.

== Life ==
About his life, not much is known. He studied Ash'rai theology and Quranic interpretation with Abu al-Qasim al-Ansari, the leading Ash'arite figure in the Muslim East, following the death of his master al-Juwayni. Naturally, this study had to have happened in Nishapur, most likely at the Nizamiyya school, where al-Ansari was employed as a librarian. Al-Makki studied Shafi'i law under the esteemed Shafi'i scholar al-Baghawi in Merv based in Khorasan. Al-Makki assumed the role of preacher in Rey's main mosque, possibly carrying on his father's legacy. He presumably died in the year of 559/1163-4 when his son, Fakhr al-Din al-Razi was at the age of fourteen or fifteen.

== Works ==
Al-Makki is said to have written a number of theological and juristic writings, some of which Fakhr al-Din occasionally cites. An authentic copy of the second volume on his most significant work, the Ash'ari theology summa, Nihayat al-Maram fi Dirayat al-Kalam ("The acme of aspirations in the study of kalam"), has just shown up. It is a huge two-volume work. Because it is one of the few surviving summae of traditional Ash'arism and because it provides insight into the theological transition that occurred during Fakhr al-Din's upbringing, this book is historically significant. The extant portion of the Nihaya closely follows al-Juwayni's and al-Ansari's kalam works in terms of theological content and structure. Al-Makki's most famous theological perspective holds that God's contingent existence is necessary since His existent is required, but created beings' existence is maintained by an accidental continuing existence that God generates in them. This concept, which is distinct from Ash'arism, might have had an impact on the preliminary stages of Fakhr al-Din al-Razi's metaphysics.

== Bibliography ==
- Shihadeh, Ayman (1971). "Ḍiyāʾ al-Dīn al-Makkī". In Lewis, B.; Ménage, V. L.; Pellat, Ch. & Schacht, J. (eds.). The Encyclopaedia of Islam, Second Edition. Volume III: H–Iram. Leiden: E. J. Brill. doi:10.1163/1573-3912_ei3_COM_27353. OCLC 495469525.
- Ayman Shihadeh (2016). "International Journal of Innovation, Creativity and Change". In Fleet, Kate; Krämer, Gudrun; Matringe, Denis; Nawas, John; Rowson, Everett (eds.). Encyclopaedia of Islam (3rd ed.). Brill. p. 69-70. ISSN 1873-9830.
- Sabine Schmidtke (2016). The Oxford Handbook of Islamic Theology. Oxford University Press. p. 12. ISBN 9780199696703.
