= Kamal al-Din ibn Yunus =

Irqi mathematician and chemist (1156–1242)

Kamāl al-Dīn ibn Yūnus (1156–1242) was an Iraqi Muslim polymath known for his writings on mathematics, although he also studied and taught astronomy, theology, philology, law, philosophy and medicine. For many years he taught Muslim, Christian and Jewish pupils at his own school in his native city of Mosul.

== Life ==
A biography of Ibn Yūnus appears in the ʿUyūn al-anbāʾ fī ṭabaqāt al-aṭibbāʾ of Ibn Abī Uṣaybiʿa. An even longer one is found in the Wafayāt of Ibn Khallikān, whose father was a friend of Ibn Yūnus. Ibn Abī Uṣaybiʿa gives his kunya as Abū ʿImrān, while Ibn Khallikān gives it as Abū al-Fatḥ. Kamāl al-Dīn was his laqab, while his given name was Mūsā and his nasab (patronymic) was ibn Yūnus ibn Muḥammad ibn Manʿat.

Ibn Yūnus was born in Mosul in 1156 (AH 551) and studied in Baghdad. He became expert in astronomy, mathematics, medicine, theology and Greek philosophy or ḥikma. In Islamic law, he belonged to the Shāfiʿī school. He also had a reputation for philology.

Ibn Yūnus returned to Mosul to teach, setting up a school in a local mosque. He became "the most learned and sought-after teacher in the Islamic world of his generation" and "one of the main attractions of Mosul". In the words of Ibn Abī Uṣaybiʿa, he was "the paragon of the scholars and the chief of the philosophers". He taught the interpretation of the Qurʾan, the Torah and the Gospels, even attracting Christian and Jewish student. According to Bar Hebraeus, the Antiochene Christian scholar Theodore of Antioch studied al-Fārābī, Ibn Sīnā, Euclid and Ptolemy under Ibn Yūnus in Mosul and later returned there for further study. Among his other students were Naṣīr al-Dīn al-Ṭūsī, Sirāj al-Din Urmawī, ʿAlam al-Dīn Qayṣar and Athīr al-Dīn al-Abharī.

During negotiations to end the Sixth Crusade in 1229, the Emperor Frederick II sent a set of mathematical questions to Sultan al-Kāmil asking for solutions. According to al-Qazwīnī, the sultan passed them along to Ibn Yūnus, although Ibn Abī Uṣaybiʿa records that an imperial envoy was dispatched to the atabeg of Mosul, Badr al-Dīn Luʾluʾ, who sent him on to the scholar. Ibn Abī Uṣaybiʿa uses the story to demonstrate Ibn Yūnus's knowledge of "magic" (sīmiyāʾ). Since "Ibn Yūnus used to wear rough clothes without affectation and had no knowledge of the things of the world", the atabeg demanded that the scholar "prepare a splendid salon" for the envoy. The scholar's students then found his room "adorned with the most beautiful and finest Byzantine carpets with a group of slaves and servants in fine clothes", but as soon as "the emissary had gone all that we had seen before vanished".

Ibn Yūnus died in Mosul in 1242 (AH 639).

== Works ==
Only Ibn Yūnus's mathematical works survive. Four are known:

- Treatise on Proof of the Premise Neglected by Archimedes in His Book on the Division of a Cirlce to Seven Parts and on the Property of Its Use
- Commentary on Geometric Construction
- Treatise on Proof that it is Impossible for Two Odd Square Numbers to Exist so that Their Sum is Square
- Treatise on Proof of two Premises Neglected by Apollonius at the End of the First Book of Conic Sections

In response to a query from Frederick II, Ibn Yūnus gave a method for determining the quadrature of a circular segment. Another problem addressed by Ibn Yūnus was later used by his former student, Theodore of Antioch, to test Leonardo Fibonacci. The problem asks, for what integer values of x, y and z is each of the following sums the square of an integer:

$$x+y+z+x^2$$
$$x+y+z+x^2+y^2$$
$$x+y+z+x^2+y^2+z^2$$

In addition to his mathematical treatises, Khayr al-Din al-Zirikli in his Alam describes a Book on Sultan's Mysteries on Stars and Paul Kunitsche reported seeing a manuscript of a treatise on the linear astrolabe, the Treatise on the Stick of Sharaf al-Ṭūsī.

== Bibliography ==
- Arndt, Sabine (2016). Judah ha-Cohen and the Emperor's Philosopher Dynamics of Transmission at Cultural Crossroads (PhD dissertation). St Cross College.
- Burnett, Charles F. S. (2016). "Master Theodore, Frederick II's Philosopher". Arabic into Latin in the Middle Ages: The Translators and their Intellectual and Social Context. Variorum Collected Studies Series. Routledge. pp. 225–285. [Originally published in Federico II e le Nuove Culture: Atti del XXXI Convegno Storico Internazionale, Todi, 9–12 ottobre, 1994 (Spoleto: 1995).]
- Hasse, Dag Nikolaus (2000). "Mosul and Frederick II Hohenstaufen: Notes on Aṯ īraddīn al-Abharī and Sirāǧaddīn al-Urmawī". In B. van den Abeele; A. Tihon; I. Draelants (eds.). Occident et Proche-Orient: contacts scientifiques au temps des Croisades (Actes du colloque de Louvain-la-Neuve, 24 et 25 mars 1997). Brepols. pp. 145–163. doi:10.1484/M.REM-EB.3.938.
- Kedar, Benjamin Z.; Kohlberg, Etan (2013) [1997]. "The Intercultural Career of Theodore of Antioch". In Benjamin Arbel (ed.). Intercultural Contacts in the Medieval Mediterranean: Studies in Honour of David Jacoby. Routledge. pp. 164–176.
- Mac Guckin de Slane, William, ed. (1868). Ibn Khallikan's Biographical Dictionary. Vol. 3. Paris: Oriental Translation Fund of Great Britain and Ireland.
- Rozenfeld, Boris; İhsanoğlu, Ekmeleddin (2003). Mathematicians, Astronomers and Other Scholars of Islamic Civilisation and Their Works (7th–19th c.). Research Centre for Islamic History, Art, and Culture.
- Watson, Alasdair; van Gelder, Geert Jan (2020). "Iraqi Physicians and the Physicians of al-Jazīrah and Diyār Bakr". In Emilie Savage-Smith; Simon Swain; Geert Jan van Gelder (eds.). A Literary History of Medicine: The ʿUyūn al-anbāʾ fī ṭabaqāt al-aṭibbāʾ of Ibn Abī Uṣaybiʿah. Vol. 3-1: Annotated English Translation. pp. 556–834.
