= Abdol Hamid Khosro Shahi =

Abdul Hamid Khosroshahi (Persian: عبدالحمید خسروشاهی) was an Iranian theologian, philosopher and Shafi'i jurist in the sixth and seventh centuries AH, equivalent to 12th and 13th centuries AD. He is called one of the disciples of Farid al-Din Damad and Fakhr al-Din al-Razi, and his important work in the field of logic is the summarized "logic of healing" and a glossary on the book Abu Ishaq al-Shirazi.

== Life ==
His full name was Shams Al Din Abdul Hamid ibn Isa Khosroshahi. He was born in Khosrowshah, a village located near Tabriz in 1184 AD in the district of Khosrowshah.

== Students and teachers ==
Khosroshahi studied tradition and theology with Mo'ayyede Tusi, learning about the work of teachers such as Fakhr al-Din al-Razi, Shahabuddin Mohtasham and Haakm. The most eminent of Khosroshahi's students were Damietta and Zinedine. However, some historians also believe Sadydadyn Mansour was the pupil of Khosroshahi in philosophy and medicine. The physician Ibn Qof was one of the pupils of Khosroshahi in medicine. Ibn Qof wrote ancient transcript on the field of surgery. Some believe that Ibn Qof also learned philosophy from Khosroshahi.

== Comments by others ==
Morteza Motahhari wrote about Khosroshahi as an eminent philosopher and jurist in response to Nasir al-Din al-Tusi's questions. Mulla Sadra also wrote an essay about him.

== See also ==
- Principles of Islamic jurisprudence
- Schools of Islamic theology
