= Tahdhib al-Ahkam =

Hadith collection by Abu Ja'far Muhammad Ibn Hasan Tusi

Tahdhib al-Ahkam تَهْذِيب ٱلَأَحْكَام
- Front cover of Tahdhib al-Ahkam
- Author: Abu Jafar Muhammad Ibn Hassan Tusi
- Language: Arabic
- Media type: Book

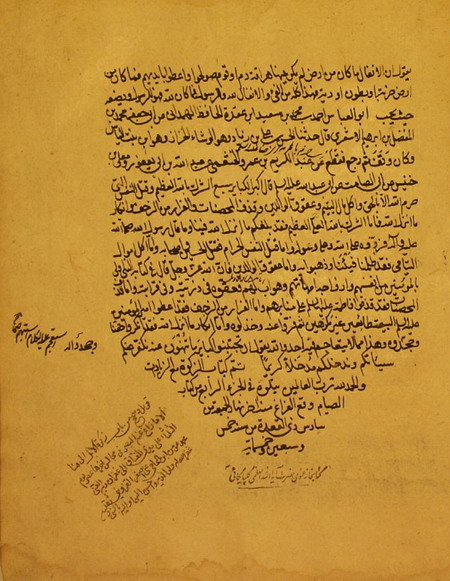
Manuscript from Tahdhib al-Ahkam

Hadith from page 369

Tahdhib al-Ahkam (Arabic: تَهْذِيب ٱلَأَحْكَام فِي شَرْح ٱلْمُقْنِعَة, romanized: Tahdhīb al-Aḥkām fī Sharḥ al-Muqniʿa, lit. 'Rectification of the Statutes in Explaining the Disguised') is the third hadith collection of the Four Books of Shia Islam. It was compiled by Twelver Shia Hadith scholar al-Tusi. This work is included among the four books of Shia Islam. It is a commentary on the al-Muqni'a by Al-Shaykh Al-Mufid, who was a Twelver Shia theologian.

== Title ==
Tahdhib al-Ahkam is translated by Ludwig W. Adamec as confirmation of decision and by I.K.A Howard as The Refinement of the Laws (as Discussed).

== Author ==
Abu Jafar Muhammad Ibn Hasan Tusi (Persian: ابوجعفر محمد بن حسن توسی) known as Shaykh al-Ta'ifah (Arabic: شيخ الطائفة) or Shaykh al-Tusi was born in 996 AD in Tus, Iran. He was a Persian Shia Twelver scholar and authored two references of Shia collections of tradition, Tahdhib al-Ahkam and Al-Istibsar. Al-Shaikh al-Tusi died in Najaf on the 22nd of Muharram on 2 December 1067.

== Background ==
Al-Istibsar is one of the four major Shia collections of Hadith (Persian: الكتب الاربعة) authored by Shaykh Tusi. According to Ali Nasiri, when Shaykh Tusi transferred to Baghdad and participated in the class session of Shaykh al-Mufid, he found conflicting Hadith (traditions) in Shia sources. Due to his nomination at the introduction of Tahdhib al-Ahkam, he wrote the book as a commentary on the Al-Muqni'ah for solving the crisis of contradiction in the Shia Islamic seminary in response to his friend request. Ali Nasiri give three reasons for selection Al-Muqni'ah by Shaykh Tusi: dignity of Al-Shaykh Al-Mufid, Al-Muqni'ah was based on Shia view and last reason is fruition of Al-Shaykh Al-Mufid’s intellectual and mental protection.

== Content ==
Shaykh Tusi explained his style in authoring the Tahdhib al-Ahkam in the introduction of it. According to viewpoint of Ali Nasiri, Shaykh Tusi authored this book basis on the six phases:

1. Mention the jurisprudential issues by keeping the structure of the book al-Muqni'ah by Shaykh al-Mufid
2. Recounting their proof except tradition (Hadith): Shaykh Tusi nominated to three type of proof, the Quran, Sunnah and consensus (agreement of the Muslim scholars basically on religious issues). The types of Quranic evidence was described by him. Also, according to his belief, Sunnah may contain Mutawatir tradition or Ahaad. In view of Shaykh Tusi, consensus referred to an agreement of Shia Muslim scholars.
3. Recounting the Hadith proof: one of the fundamental parts at Tahdhib al-Ahkam is to rely on the tradition that protects every issue.
4. Recounting the conflicting proof: rectifying the conflicting tradition was the main purpose of Shaykh Tusi for authoring this book. So he devoted the main part of his work to examine such tradition with a tradition that verifies every issue.
5. Describing the way of rectifying concordant and conflicting traditions: after determining this type of tradition, Shaykh Tusi inspect the way of rectifying.
6. Citing tradition in a bid to declare the interpretation: Shaykh Tusi used interpretation and rationalization to rectifying concordant and conflicting traditions.

Therefore, Shaykh Tusi proceeded to his work in three step:

1. Transmitting tradition that verifies every issue
2. Transmitting tradition that contrasts the first set of tradition
3. Transmitting tradition that affirms the interpretation

Tahdhib al-Ahkam contains the following:

I: Ritual purity in Islam (Arabic: الطهارة (Taharah))
II: Prayer
III: religious tax
IV: fasting regulated by Islamic jurisprudence
V: Pilgrimage
VI: Sacred War
VII: Judgements and Legal Requirements (Arabic: القضاء و الاحکام)
VIII: Acquisitions (Arabic: المکاسب)
IX: Trade (Arabic: التجارة)
X: Marriage in Islam
XI: Divorce
XII: Manumission of Slaves
XIII: Oaths, Vows and Atonements
XIV: Hunting and Ritual Slaughter
XV: Endowments and Alms
XVI: Bequests
XVII: Formal Rules of Inheritance
XVIII: Punishment prescribed by Revelation
XIX: Indemnities for Bodily Injury

According to Najaf publication, Tahdhib al-Ahkam included 409 chapters, 13988 traditions and according to the counting of Muhaddis Noori it included 393 chapters, 13590 traditions. This variance between reports had led by mistake in counting.

== See also ==
- Akhlaq-i Nasiri
- Hilyat al-Muttaqin
