= Sharh al-Isharat =

Book by Nasir al-Din al-Tusi

Sharh al-Isharat (شرح الإشارات) is a philosophical commentary on Avicenna's book Al-isharat wa al-tanbihat (Remarks and Admonitions). It was written by Nasir al-Din al-Tusi in defense of the philosophy of Avicenna in response to the criticism made against him by Fakhr al-Din al-Razi in a book of the same title.

== Author ==
Abu Ja'far Muhammad Nasir al-Din al-Tusi, (b. Ṭus, 17 February 1201/d. Baghdad, 25 June 1274), was a polymath and vizier, whose significant works in literary, theological and scientific disciplines later earned him the title of Mu'allim al-Thalith, i.e., the third teacher, following Aristotle and Farabi.

== About Isharat ==
Al-isharat wa al-tanbihat is the last book written by Avicenna and the most prominent one. The book is on logic, natural philosophy and theology and metaphysics. Al-isharat wa al-tanbihat could be considered generally as a later work and therefore an expression of Avicenna's mature thought. Ibn sina advice that book to his disciples as a kind of work book. In this book ibn Sina calls for his disciples to establish in the right way the conclusions and/or the premises to reach conclusions. In other words, Avicenna doesn't intend to develop fully articulated arguments in Al-isharat wa al-tanbihat. This makes it very abstract and a demanding text for any reader.

== The book ==
Sharh Al-isharat wa al-tanbihat or commentary of Al-isharat wa al-tanbihat is a collection of books written by Nasir ad-Din al-Tusi for detailing and defending of Avicenna's work in front of fakhr Razi. According to Hosein Nasr, the influence of Fakhr al-Din al-Razi and his technical discussions of later Islamic philosophy was not recognized until now. Razi had important attack against peripatetic philosophy. This attack manifested in detail in the book of sharh al-Isharat which is written in the criticism of Avicenna's al-Isharat. Nasir al-Din has written the responses that resuscitated Avicennian philosophy. In the fourteenth century, this central debate was carried further by Qubal-Din al-Razi in his al-Muhakamat (Trials), in which he sought to judge between the commentaries of Fakhr al-Din al-Razi and al-Tusi. this collection until day counted as the most commentary on the book of admonitions and remarks and later men of wisdom had explain and develop it. Avicenna’s Al-isharat wa al-tanbihat was well known in philosophical circles, and numerous commentaries, glosses, and summaries had been written on it. One of the earliest commentaries was perhaps Shahrastani’s (d. 445/1153) polemical I'tiqadat 'alkalam al-isarat, to which 'Umar ibn Sahlan as-Sawi (d. ca. 549/1145) eventually wrote a reply. Fakhr al-Din ar-Razi (d. 606/1209) then wrote his famous Sarh al-Isharat and an abridged version of its essential theses, titled Lubab al-Isharat. Sa'd ibn Oasan ibn Hibat Allah (Muhammad) Ibn Kammuna al-Isra'ili (d. 676/1277) wrote a sharh to the al-Isharat. Nasir ad-Din al-Tusi (672/1274) wrote a sharh to the al-Isharat, as well as Hall Mushkilat al-Isharat. Although a number of these scholars knew Persian, these works were all written in Arabic, and no Persian medieval translation of al-Isharat has been recorded by Brockelmann. Tūsī wrote supercommentaries on Rāzī’s commentary. Their supercommentaries sought to demonstrate a critical distance from Rāzī’s Sharh, rather than a critical distance from Avicenna’s Ishārāt. Somewhat less aggressively, Tūsī levels accusations at Rāzī that Rāzī had earlier leveled at Mas'ūdī: of offering criticisms presumptuously, of not yet having worked hard enough to understand Avicenna’s theories and arguments fully and thereby present them fairlym In the preface to his Hall Mushkilāt al-Ishārāt, after praising Avicenna extravagantly and singling out the Ishārāt as an expression of Avicenna’s ideas referred to by Tusi.

== Content ==
This seminal work on Peripatetic philosophy established him beyond doubt as the greatest Avicennan philosopher after the master himself. This category of the works include his rebuttals to the criticisms of Ibn Sina by al-Shahrastani’s al-Musara'at and Razi’s earlier critical commentary upon Ibn Sina’s Al-isharat wa al-tanbihat. Known also as Sharh al-isharat, this work, which is a major philosophical masterpiece in both form and content, resuscitated Ibn Sina’s teachings once and for all in the East. Devoted to expounding the teachings of the master in this work refrained from expressing any views of his own except when it came to God’s knowledge of the world, where Nasir Al Din accepted the views of Suhraward, which he also knew well. The work became so famous that it in turn became the subject of many later commentaries, the most famous by Qutb al-Din al-Raz.
