= Al-Istibsar =

Fourth hadith collection of the Four Books of Shia Islam

Al-Istibsar الاستبصار
- Front cover of Al-Istibsar
- Author: Shaykh Tusi
- Language: Arabic
- Media type: Book

al-Istibsar (Arabic: ٱلِٱسْتِبْصَار فِيمَا ٱخْتُلِفَ مِن ٱلْأَخْبَار, romanized: al-Istibṣār fī-mā ukhtulifa min al-Akhbār, lit. 'Reflection Upon The Disputed Traditions') is the fourth hadith collection of the Four Books of Shia Islam. It was compiled by Persian scholar al-Tusi. It includes the same subjects as Tahdhib al-Ahkam (Rectification of the Statutes) but in a shorter form.

== Author ==
Al-Tusi lived during the first half of the 5th century AH. He is the best known jurist and Mujtahid of the Shia. Born in Tus in 385 AH, he lived his early life there. He received primary education in his homeland of Iran, and had higher studies in Baghdad. At the time, Baghdad was the seat of the Abbasid Caliphate and a great center of learning. Abbaside rule stretched from North Africa and south Arabia to China. Consequently, Baghdad was a seat of learning and meeting point for scholars and intellectuals from all parts of the world. The greatest personality of this period was al-Shaykh al-Mufid who resided in the Shia neighborhood of Karkh in an opulent atmosphere.

Shaykh al-Tusi taught the teachings of Islam in the presence of the great masters such as Shaykh al-Mufid, Sharif al-Murtaza, Ibn Ghada’iri, and ibn Abdun.

Two authoritative Shia resources, Tahdhib al-Ahkam and Al-Istibsar, were written by Shaykh al-Tusi. He also authored many works such as Talkhis al-Shafi, al-Muqni fi ‘l-ghayba, al-Ghayba, al-Tibyan fi Tafsir al-Quran, al-Khilaf, al-Mabsut fi fiqh al-Imamiyah.

Sayyid Murtada Alam al-Huda (Sharif al-Murtaza) wrote some works on an Imamate called al-Shafi. It was written as a response to the section on Imamte of Mutazili Qadi Abd al-Jabbar’s al- Mughni. This work summarized by Shaykh al-Tusi that was titled Talkhis al-Shafi.

== Background ==
Al-Istibsar is one of the four major Shia collections of Hadith authored by Shaykh Tusi. He authored this book after writing Tahdhib al-Ahkam, when his colleagues asked him to summarize the book and determined traditions which disagree and explain the reconciliation between the two without leaving out anything which was influential.

He wrote in the introduction of Al-Istibsar:

It would be useful that there should be a reference (madhkur) book which a beginner could use in his study of jurisprudence, or one who has finished, to remind himself, or the intermediate (student) to study more deeply. Thus (so that) all of them could obtain what they need and reach their soul's desire, what is connected with different traditions would be set in an abridged way. Therefore they asked me to summarize it (Tahdhib al-Ahkam) and devote care to its compilation and abridgement, and to begin each section with an introduction about what I relied on for the legal decisions and traditions in it; then I should follow with those traditions which disagree and explain the reconciliation between the two without leaving out anything which was influential.

It does not include many traditions and explanations are brief.

== Context ==
Al-Istibsar is authored about Hadiths that seemingly are at variance with each other or "show discrepancies" in their contents. It included three parts. The first two parts are about Worship (except Jihad), and the last part is allocated to subjects of jurisprudence. The first part includes 300 chapters with 1899 Hadiths. The second part has 270 chapters with 1177 Hadiths, and the last part includes 398 chapters with 2455 Haithes. To avoid distortion, Shaykh Tusi determined the number of Hadiths in the book exactly. Al-Istibsar included 5511 Hadiths. In the specific print of the book, 5558 Hadiths have been reported, which is caused by the manner of counting.

== Recitations ==
Many Shiite scholars have written explanations for Al-Istibsar, including the following:

- Sheykh Abdul-Latif ibn Ahmad ibn Abi Jam'e Harethi Shami Ameli (a pupil of Shaikh Bahai) in his book entitled "Jame'ul-Akhbar Fi Eizah-il-Istibsar"
- Muhammad Jamaluddin al-Makki al-Amili khnown as Shahid Awwal (The First Martyr), in his book Nukatul-Irshad (Points of Guidance)
- Sayyid Mirza Hasan ibn Abdul-Rasool Husseini Zonoozi Khu'ei (1172-1223 AH) in his work Sharhe Istibsar (Explanations of Istibsar)
- Amir Muhammad ibn Amir Abdul-Wassi' Khatoon Abadi (d.1116 AH), a son-in-law of Allameh Majlesi, in his book Sharhe Istibsar (Explanations of Istibsar)
- Sheykh Abdul-Reza Tufaili Najafi in Sharhe Istibsar(Explanations of Istibsar)
- Ibne Alwandi, Faqihe Kazemi, Qasim son of Muhammad Jawad (d. some time later than 1100 AH), a contemporary of Shaikh al-Hur al-Aamili, in his work Explanations of Istibsar
- Allamah Sayyid Muhsin ibn Hasan A'arji Kazemi (d.1127 AH), in his book Explanations of Istibsar

== See also ==
- Al-Kafi
- Man la yahduruhu al-Faqih
