= Hilyat al-Muttaqin =

Book by Muḥammad Bāqir Ibn-Muḥammad Taqī Maǧlisī

Hilyat al-Muttaqin (Persian: حلیه المتقین)
- Front cover of Hilyat al-Muttaqin
- Author: Muhammad Baqir al-Majlisi
- Language: Persian
- Media type: Book

Hilyat al-Muttaqin (The Cloak for the Pious, Arabic: حلیه المتقین) is a Hadith book of Muhammad Baqir al-Majlisi. This work is written in Persian about Islamic morality, instructions and traditions. It was translated into English by Sayyid Athar Husayn S.H. Rizvi and published by Ansariyan Publications in 2013.

== The aim of writing ==
According to book's foreword, it was written because of a group of Muslims asked Majlisi to write a Persian book in the Islamic morality, instructions and traditions from the hadith of Ahl al-Bayt.

== Date of writing ==
According to a manuscript, the date of writing of this work is 1671, But in another book has been mentioned to 1668-9.

== Content and chapters ==
The book has 14 chapters about individual and collective morality and some Fiqh rulings, Duas and practices and had an extra chapter about some etiquette miscellaneous and their benefits. The titles of chapters are mentioned below:

- Etiquette of clothing,
- Etiquette of using jewellery for men and women, using Kohl, dyeing with henna and looking in the mirror,
- Etiquette of eating and drinking,
- Worthiness of marriage, etiquette of socializing with women and training children,
- Etiquette of brushing teeth, heckling the hairs, cropping the nails, mustache and hair, etc.
- Etiquette of perfuming, smelling flowers and anointing,
- Etiquette of bathing and some ghusls,
- Etiquette of sleeping and waking,
- Etiquette of Hijama, Enema, benefits of some drugs, treating some diseases and mentioning some related duas,
- Etiquette with people and the rights of guilds,
- Etiquette of meetings such as hailing, shaking hands, hugging, kissing, etc.
- Etiquette of entering and going out the home,
- Etiquette of going on foot, riding, buying, trading, agriculture, and keeping beasts,
- Etiquette of traveling
- Some etiquette miscellaneous and their benefits.

== See also ==
- Akhlaq-i Nasiri
- Tahdhib al-Ahkam
