= Nasirean Ethics =

Book by Nasir al-Din al-Toesi

Nasirean Ethics Akhlaq-i Nasiri (Persian: اخلاق ناصری)
- Persian front cover of Nasirean Ethics
- Author: Nasir al-Din al-Tusi
- Language: Persian
- Published: 13th century
- Publication place: Nizari Ismaili state
- Media type: Book

Nasirean Ethics (Persian: اخلاق ناصری, romanized: Akhlāq-i Nāsirī) is a 13th-century Persian book in philosophical ethics written by Khaje Nasir al-Din al-Tusi. This book is divided into three part: ethics, domestic economy and politics.

== Author and title ==
Nasir al-Din al-Tusi was Persian philosopher, mathematician, and theologian that was born into Shia family in Tus in 1201. He was of the Ismaili, and subsequently Twelver Shia Islamic belief. Nasir al-Din has about 150 works in different languages (Persian, Arabic).

The work is dedicated to Nasir al-Din Abu al-Fath Abd al-Rahim ibn Abi Mansur, the Nizari Ismaili governor of Quhistan who was a close friend and patron of al-Tusi.

== Reason of writing ==
At the end of thirteen century, Nasir al-Din al-Tusi wrote this book when he was in Quhistan to response to request of Nasir al-Din Abu al-Fath Abd al-Rahim ibn Abi Mansur, a Nizari Ismaili governor, for translating a famous Arabic book, Tahdhib al-Akhlaq, that was written by Miskawayh. The Miskawayh's book was about ethics but Nasir al-Din al-Tusi added the parts of domestic economy and politics of his work.

== Contents ==
Akhlaq-i Nasiri has three parts.

The first part is the Persian interpretation of Refinement of Morals (Tahdhib al-Akhlaq) of the earlier philosopher Miskawayh. The second part is about domestic economy and management of household affairs and contains the main mutual rights within the family as the most fundamental units of societies and the third part is about the political ideas of Nasir al-Din al-Tusi. In this part is seen the influence of Platonic, Neoplatonic and Aristotelian political ideas but also he mentioned to the ideas of Pre-Islamic rulers of Iran specially Achaemenid and Sasanian.

== Influence over later books ==
Akhlaq-i Nasiri had influenced Jalaladdin Davani in Akhlaq-i Jalali, Hosayn Va'iz Kashifi in Akhlaq-i Mohseni and Mulla Mahdi Naraqi in Jame' al-Sa'adat.

== See also ==
- Hilyat al-Muttaqin
- Tahdhib al-Ahkam

== Bibliography ==
English translation of the book

- Nasir ad-Din Tusi (2011). The Nasirean Ethics. Translated by Wickens, G. M. Routledge. ISBN 978-0-415-61047-6.
