= Tajrid al-I'tiqad =

Book by Nasir al-Din al-Tusi

Tajrīd al-iʿtiqād (Arabic: تجريد الاعتقاد) or Tajrid al-Kalam is a work by Nasir al-Din al-Tusi about Shia beliefs in Islamic theology. Tajrīd is the most famous scholastic text in Shiite theology and most effective work in history of apologetic written by Nasir al-Dīn Ṭūsī.

== Author ==
Ṭusi, was a celebrated polymath and vizier, whose prominent work was on topics in literary, theological and scientific disciplines. Ṭūsī (d. 672/1274) was admired by scholars in spheres such as Kalam and philosophy. He wrote nearly 274 essays on different subjects. His theological works is along with criticism of precedents such as Talkhis Al Mohassal or guidebooks in Arabic and Persian language for the sake of learning.

== Title ==
There are different opinions on the title of the work. Agha Bozorg sees the name of the book as Tahrir with reference to Tusi's expressions in its introduction. Agha Bozorg views the composite name of Tajrid Al Kalam fi Tahrir Al Eteghad as the title in his writings. Some people know Tahrir as a false record of Tajrid.

There are many other references to the book by titles such as Tajrid al-'aqa'id, and Tajrid Al Kalam. Some, like Taftazani, express doubts on attributing the book to Nasi Al Din because of the inconsistencies between Sharhe esharat and Tajrid. Instead someone such as Sabzevari didn’t accept such a hesitation. According to Gharamaleki he couldn’t count Taftazani's reason as sufficient for not attributing the book to Tusi, since these inconsistencies could be ascribed to evolution in Tusi's thinking. Tusi wrote the book after reverting to the Twelvers sect, rather than during his time as an Ismaili patriot.

== Sections ==
The Tajrīd has six sections or maqāṣid dealing with the following matters: (a) general ontology, (b) substance and accident, (c) metaphysics or ilāhīyāt, (e) prophecy, (f) the Imamate, (g) resurrection or al-maʿād.

== Commentaries ==
Ṭūsī's work has enjoyed the attention of commentators and glossators. The first was by his student al-Allama al-Hilli (d. 1325 CE), others are by Shams al-din Iṣfahānī (d. 1348), Al-Sharif al-Jurjani (d. 1414) and Ali Qushji (d. 1474). The commentaries were circulated widely in India.

== Translations ==
Theology Abstracted, An Arabic critical edition and English translation of Naṣīr al-Dīn al-Ṭūsī's Tajrid al-Iʿtiqād by Dr Sayyid Amjad H. Shah Naqavi (London: The Shīʿah Institute Press, 2025). ISBN 9781917761000 (hardback).
