= Nasir al-Din Abu al-Fath Abd al-Rahim ibn Abi Mansur =

Nasir al-Din Nasir al-Din Abu al-Fath Abd al-Rahim ibn Abi Mansur
- ناصرالدین ابوالفتح عبدالرحیم بن ابی منصور
- Title: Muhtasham

Personal life
- Born: Unknown
- Died: February , 1257 (Safar 655 AH)
- Occupation: governor of Quhistan

Religious life
- Religion: Islam
- Denomination: Nizari Ismaili Shia

Nasir al-Din Abu al-Fath Abd al-Rahim ibn Abi Mansur (Persian: ناصرالدین ابوالفتح عبدالرحیم بن ابی منصور), or simply Nasir al-Din, was a scholar and the last muhtasham (governor) of the Nizari Ismaili province of Quhistan.

Himself a learned man, he was a close friend and patron of the renowned Persian polymath Nasir al-Din al-Tusi, who entered his service and dedicated to him his two works on ethics, Akhlaq-i Nasiri (Nasirean Ethics, compiled in 1235) and Akhlaq-i muhtashami.

During the Mongol campaign against the Nizaris by Hülegü, the latter sent Malik Shams al-Din Muhammad, the Kartid ruler of Herat, on a mission to Nasir al-Din while he was residing in the fortress of Sartahkt, in order to persuade him to capitulate to the Mongols.

Starting the campaign via Quhistan, Hülegü's vanguard under Kitbuqa and Köke Ilgei conquered Tun twice, and after regrouping with Hülegü, the Mongols attacked Tus. Probably at this point, Hülegü received Nasir al-Din. When asked by Hülegü why he did not bring his garrison, the muhtasham explained that the Nizaris obey only their Imam, Rukn al-Din Khurshah. Nevertheless, Hülegü gave the aged muhtasham a yarligh and a paiza, and appointed him as the ruler of the ruined city of Tun. He died around a year later in Safar 655 AH (February/March 1257).
