= Awada =

Awada is a surname. Notable people with the surname include:

- Alejandro Awada (born 1961), Argentine actor
- George Awada (born 1975), American ice hockey player
- Hussein Awada (born 1990), Lebanese footballer
- Joe Awada (born 1959), American poker player
- Juliana Awada (born 1974), First Lady of Argentina
