= Karima al-Marwaziyya =

11th century hadith scholar

Personal life
- Born: Karima bint Ahmad bin Muhammad bin Hatim al-Marwaziyya; 969 Kushmihan, near Merv
- Died: 1069 Mecca
- Main interest(s): Hadith
- Notable work(s): Transmission of Sahih al-Bukhari

Religious life
- Religion: Islam
- Denomination: Sunni
- Jurisprudence: Hanafi

Senior posting
- Influenced: * Al-Khatib al-Baghdadi; Abu al-Ghana’im al-Nursi

Karima bint Ahmad bin Muhammad bin Hatim al-Marwaziyya (969-1069) was an 11th-century scholar of hadith.

== Biography ==
Karima was born in the village of Kushmihan near Merv. She later settled in Mecca.

Karima was an authority on Sahih al-Bukhari. She taught the text of al-Bukhari to students and her scholarship and teaching was widely respected. She was known as the "musnida of the sacred precinct." Thirty-nine men and one woman transmitted material on her authority. Karima was known for her prestigious isnad. Her teaching and scholarship was praised by Abu Dharr of Herat.

Al-Khatib al-Baghdadi and Abu al-Ghana’im al-Nursi narrated from her.

By the end of her life, she was renowned as a teacher and scholar. She was a Hanafi. Karima never married and was celibate and ascetic. Louis Massingon connected her to the women's futuwwa movement founded by Khadija al-Jahniyya. This was the female equivalent of the male futuwwa societies that advocated chivalry, morality, and worship.
