= Zakariya al-Qazwini =

Persian scientist (c. 1203–1283)

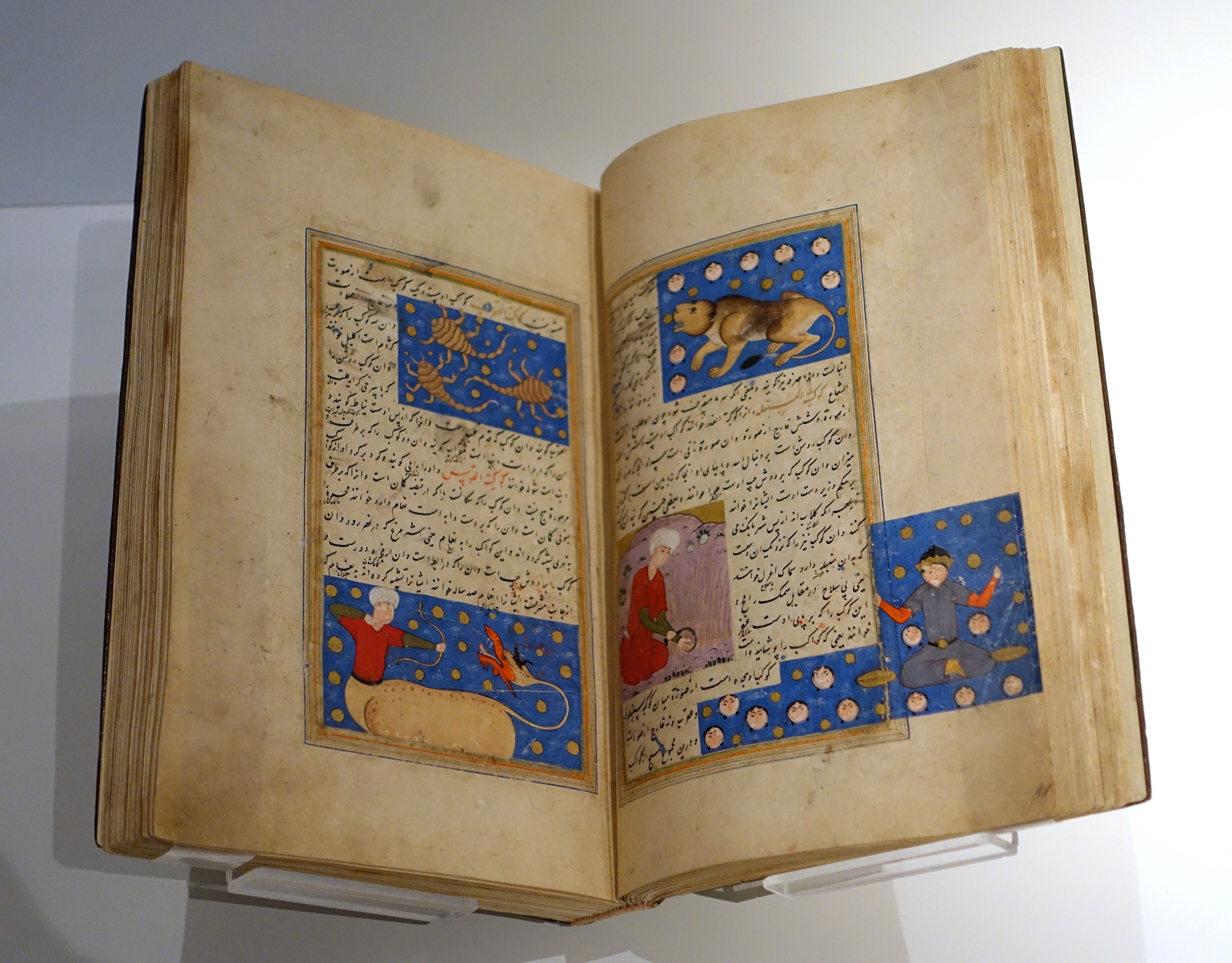
ʿAjāʾib al-makhlūqāt, 16th-century manuscript

Zakariyya' al-Qazwini (full name: Abū Yaḥyā Zakariyyāʾ ibn Muḥammad ibn Maḥmūd al-Qazwīnī, Arabic: أبو يحيى زكرياء بن محمد بن محمود القزويني), also known as Qazvini (Persian: قزوینی), (born c. 1203 in Qazvin, Iran, and died 1283), was a professor, jurist, cosmographer and geographer.

Qazwini’s most famous work is his cosmography titled ʿAjāʾib al-makhlūqāt wa-gharāʾib al-mawjūdāt or Wonders of the Creation and Unique [phenomena] of the Existence. This treatise, frequently illustrated, was immensely popular and has been preserved today in many copies. Al-Qazwini was also well known for his geographical dictionary Āthār al-bilād wa-akhbār al-ʿibād or Monuments of the Lands and Historical Traditions about Their Peoples. Both of these treatises reflect extensive knowledge in a wide range of disciplines.

== Early life and family ==
Qazwini was born in Qazvin, Iran to a family of Muslim jurists who descended from Anas bin Malik, a companion of the Islamic prophet Muhammad. In 1220, at the age of 16 or 17, Qazwini fled to Mosul after an early Mongol campaign led by Genghis Khan reached Qazvin. Sometime before Qazwini relocated to Mosul, he received a legal education.

== Career ==
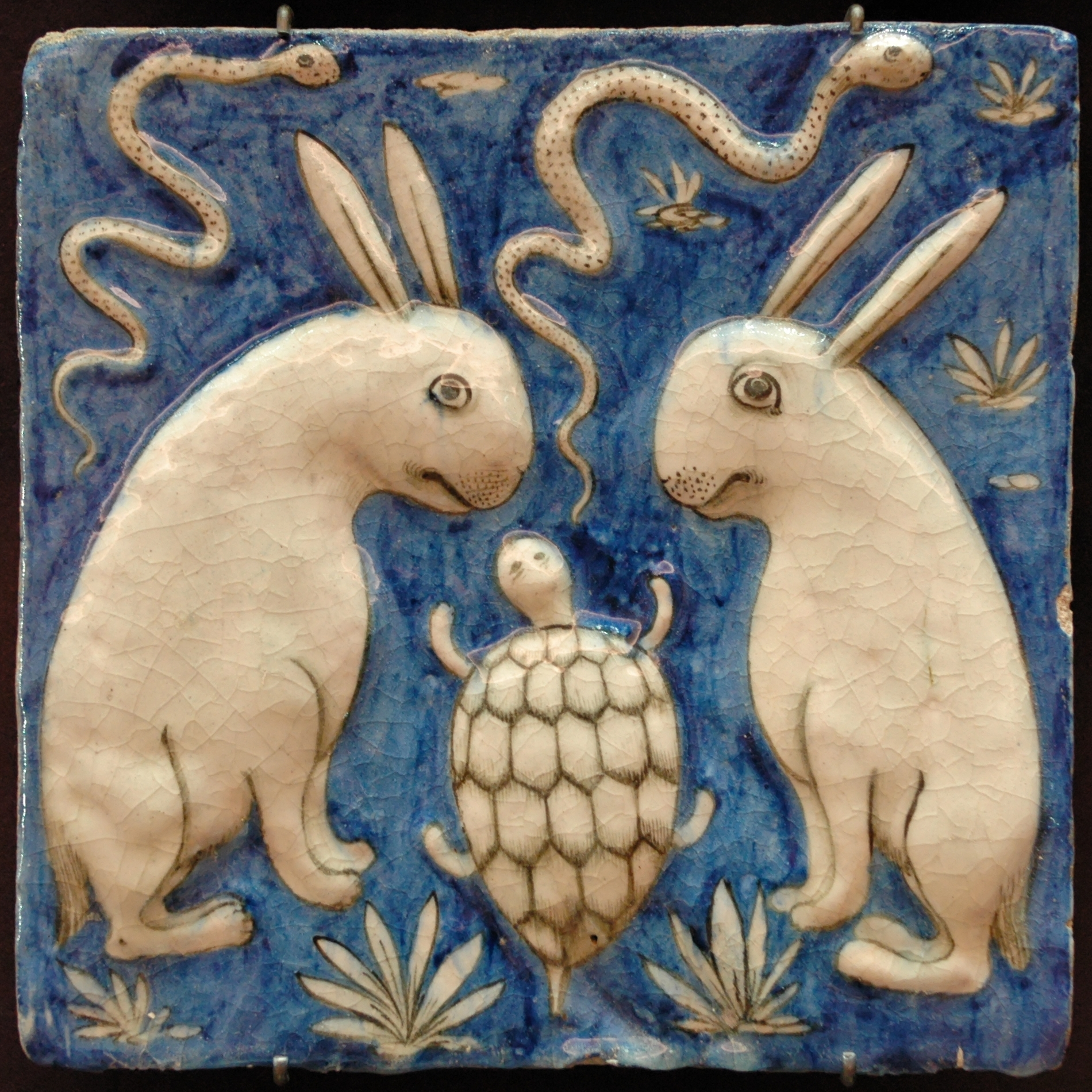
Tile with two rabbits, two snakes and a tortoise (illustration of a scene in the ʿAjāʾib al-makhlūqāt; Iran, 19th century)

While in Mosul, Qazwini studied mathematics, astronomy, religion philosophy, and geography at a madrasa. Qazwini also interacted with numerous scholars in Mosul, such as the philosopher Al-Abharī, the geographer Yaqut al-Hamawi, and the historian Ibn al-Athir. In Syria, Qazwini also visited Ibn Arabi, a Sufi scholar.

After spending twenty years studying in Mosul, Qazwini relocated to Wasit, a city near Baghdad. In Wasit, Qazwini served as a professor at al-Madrasa al-Sharabiyya, a legal college, and was the chief qadi under the last Abbasid Caliph Al-Musta'sim. In 1258, the Mongols, led by Hulegu Khan, invaded Wasit during the Siege of Baghdad. Despite the subsequent fall of the Abbasid Caliphate and the formation of the Ilkhanate, Qazwini continued to serve as a qadi and professor.

Qazwini published most of his work during this period, including The Wonders of Creation and The Monuments of the Lands. Wonders of Creation, his most famous work, is a seminal work in cosmography, while Monuments of the Lands is a geographical dictionary. Despite the challenges posed by the Mongol invasion, Qazwini's works compiled a majority of the knowledge that was available to 13th century Islamic scholars, which many modern scholars perceive as a significant achievement. It is likely that Qazwini's works were also revered by his contemporaries, as his work was reproduced in multiple languages, including Arabic, Persian, and Ottoman Turkish, and was commissioned by the prominent Ilkhanid patron Ata-Malik Juvayni.

== Key works ==
Between 1219–58, Qazwini wrote The Wonders of Creation, which attempted to explain the entire existence of the universe by exploring science and art through the lens of 13th century Islamic visual culture. The structure of the work includes two cosmographies, with the first focusing on celestial forms and the second focusing on terrestrial forms. The celestial cosmography describes the heavens, angels and astrological houses, with the greatest emphasis placed upon the role of angels as a stabilizing force on earth. Next, the terrestrial cosmography discusses elements of the physical earth, like plants and living creatures. Living creatures are further categorized into three hierarchical categories: man, beasts, and lapids, with each successive category denoting a lesser classification. Since The Wonders of Creation was among the most read manuscripts of its time, it heavily influenced the style and language of later encyclopedic and geographical works.

Qazwini’s other well-known work, The Monuments of the Lands, was written between 1262–63 and edited in either 1275 or 1276. This encyclopedic work focuses on 13th century moral and literary geographies in the Islamic world and includes the work of notable Islamic geographers like Ya’qūbī and Ibn al-Faqīh. The Monuments of the Lands begins with three prologues: the first examining population growth, the second focusing on the special characteristics of towns and cities, and the third dividing earth into climate zones. The remaining portion of the encyclopedia is organized by longitude and latitude, which creates an ethnographic record of the towns, lands, and trading systems of the 13th century Islamic world.

== Intellectual context ==
Qazwini’s work was in dialogue with the philosophic tradition of Ibn Sina, an 11th century Islamic thinker who closely followed the Neoplatonic philosophy of emanationism. This philosophy was developed by the Greek philosopher Plotinus in the third century and holds that every single thing in the universe comes from a single source, which Ibn Sina defined as God. The beings that first emanated from this source are considered to be closest to perfect singularity, whereas entities that emerged later are the most imperfect and distant from God, creating a “hierarchy of creation.” Sina also emphasized that any object could inspire aesthetic appreciation or delight by evoking a sense of wonder, a belief that is directly referenced in Qazwini’s work.

His most well-known book, Wonders of Creation, aligns its structure with Sina’s emanationism, with the description of the celestial and divine spheres located at the beginning and latter half of the book concerning earthly entities. By adopting this structure, Qazwini places the most “perfect” entities (ie., the beings closest to God) first and the before the least divinely “perfect” entities last. Wonders of Creation also includes elements of Sina’s beliefs regarding wonder, as the work opens with an essay where Qazwini argues that the mysterious objects and “rarities” in his book should evoke a feeling of awe and wonder rather than fear or horror, no matter their aesthetic appearance, simply on the basis of their novelty.

Beyond the philosophy of Ibn Sina, Qazwini’s works were also written in response to the upheaval caused by the 13th century Mongol conquest of Asia. The turbulent state of the Islamic world influenced his cosmographical works, most notably Wonders of Creation, which attempted to organize the world based on an assumption of a preexisting and divinely arranged order. This likely served as a means of comfort for the intellectuals of his day and for Qazwini himself, who was personally displaced during this time period.

== Later life and death ==
Qazwini died in Wasit at age of 79 or 80 in 1283. Not much is known about the end of Qazwini's life, but it is clear that he was working as a qadi, professor, and scholar at the time of his death. In fact, one of the earliest surviving copies of Wonders of Creation is believed to have been created by Qazwini just three years before his death.

== See also ==
- List of Persian scientists and scholars
- List of pre-modern Arab scientists and scholars
