= Wahbi (Sanaa) =

Wahbi وهبي
- Sub-district
- Location in Yemen
- Country: Yemen
- Governorate: Sana'a Governorate
- District: Al Haymah Al Kharijiyah District

Population (2004)
  - Total: 767
- Time zone: UTC+3

Wahbi (Arabic: وهبي) is a sub-district located in the Al Haymah Al Kharijiyah District, Sana'a Governorate, Yemen. Wahbi had a population of 767 according to the 2004 census.
