= Makki =

Makki may refer to:

- Makki (Arabic: مكي, 'Meccan'), something or someone coming from Mecca

== People ==
=== Makki ===
- Mäkki, Estonian-born Finnish rapper and DJ
- Abdul Rehman Makki (1954–2024), Islamist activist and leading figure of Jamat ud Dawah
- Diala Makki (born 1981), Lebanese-Iranian media personality
- Fadi Makki, Lebanese behavioural scientist
- Hassan Muhammad Makki (1933–2016), politician and Prime Minister of Yemen Arab Republic in 1974
- Hossein Makki (1911–1999), Iranian politician, orator and historian
- Imdadullah Muhajir Makki (1814–1896), South Asian Muslim Sufi scholar
- Irfan Makki (born 1975), Pakistani Canadian singer-songwriter
- Najat Makki (born 1956, Emirati artist

=== Al-Makki ===
- Abu Talib al-Makki (Muhammad ibn Ali, died 996), scholar, jurist and Sufi mystic
- Diya' al-Din al-Makki (d. 550 AH), scholar, jurist and theologian
- Ibn Kathir al-Makki (45-120AH), one of the transmitters of the seven canonical Qira'at
- Muhammad Al-Makki (1145–1246), saint of the people of Sindh, warrior, ruler over Yemen and explorer
- Muhammad 'Alawi al-Maliki, Sunni scholar

== See also ==
- Maki (disambiguation)
- Makki surah, or Meccan surah, chronologically early chapters of the Quran
- Makki di roti, a flat unleavened Punjabi bread
