= Wehbe =

Wehbe is a surname. Notable people with the surname include:

- Charbel Wehbe (born 1953), Lebanese politician
- Charbel Wehbe (footballer) (born 2004), Dominican Republic footballer
- Haifa Wehbe (born 1976), Lebanese singer and actress
- Jason Wehbe (born 1992), Lebanese footballer
- Jorge Wehbe (1920–1998), Argentine lawyer, economist and politician
- Mikhail Wehbe (born 1942), Syrian diplomat
- Nancy Oshana Wehbe (born 1975), Assyrian-American bodybuilder
