= Fakhr al-Din al-Razi =

12th-century Sunni Muslim theologian and philosopher

Fakhr al-Dīn al-Rāzī
- فخر الدين الرازي
- Title: Shaykh al-Islam, al-Fakhr al-Razi, Sultan al-Mutakallimin (Sultan of the Theologians),

Personal life
- Born: 1149 or 1150 (543 or 544 AH) Ray, Seljuk Empire
- Died: 1209 (606 AH, aged 59 or 60) Herat, Ghurid Empire
- Era: Islamic Golden Age
- Region: Persia
- Main interest(s): Tafsir, Principles of Islamic jurisprudence, Rhetoric, Kalam, Islamic Philosophy, Logic, Astronomy, Cosmology, Ontology, Physiognomy, Chemistry, Physics, Medicine, Anatomy
- Notable work(s): Al-Tafsir al-Kabir (Mafatih al-Ghayb), Asas al-Taqdis
- Occupation: Scholar and scientist

Religious life
- Religion: Islam
- Denomination: Sunni
- Jurisprudence: Shafi'i
- Creed: Ash'ari

Muslim leader
- Influenced by: Al-Shafi'i, Abu al-Hasan al-Ash'ari, Ibn Furak, Ibn Sina, al-Juwayni, al-Ghazali, Diya' al-Din al-Makki
- Influenced: Athir al-Din al-Abhari, Nizam al-Din al-Nisapuri, Burhan al-Din al-Nasafi, Shihab al-Din al-Qarafi, Taj al-Din al-Subki, Al-Safadi, Ibn Abi Usaybi'a, Al-Suyuti, Sa'id Foudah

Fakhr al-Dīn al-Rāzī (Arabic: فخر الدين الرازي; Persian: فخر الدين رازی; 1149 or 1150 – 1209; AH 543–606), also known as Fakhruddin Razi and by the sobriquet Sultan of the Theologians, was a prominent Muslim theologian, philosopher, polymath, and scientist. He wrote extensively on theology, philosophy, ontology, jurisprudence, medicine, chemistry, physics, astronomy, cosmology, history, and literature, was among the pioneers of inductive logic, and was the author of the major Qur'anic commentary Tafsir al-Kabir.

Al-Rāzī was born in Ray and eventually died in Herat, in present-day Afghanistan. He opposed the Muʿtazilites and was eventually compelled into exile, ultimately settling in Herat. There he founded a madrasa, attracted numerous pupils, and received the title Shaykh al-Islām. His effort to demonstrate that theology and philosophy could be reconciled led some contemporaries to accuse him of betraying Islam, and his death may have resulted from poisoning. His philosophical and theological writings show the influence of Avicenna, Abū al-Barakāt al-Baghdādī, and al-Ghazālī. Among his most important philosophical works are Mabāḥith al-mashriqiyya fī ʿilm al-ilāhiyyāt wa-l-ṭabīʿiyyāt ("Eastern Studies in Metaphysics and Physics") and al-Maṭālib al-ʿāliya ("The Higher Issues").

In cosmology, al-Rāzī rejected the geocentric model and the Aristotelian conception of a single universe revolving around a single world. He argued for the existence of space beyond the known world and was among the earliest proponents of a plurality of worlds, comparing this conception with astronomical teachings in the Qur'an.

== Biography ==
Fakhr al-Din al-Razi, whose full name was Abū ʿAbd Allāh Muḥammad ibn ʿUmar ibn al-Ḥusayn al-Razi al-Tabaristani (Arabic: أبو عبد الله محمد بن عمر بن الحسين الرازي، الطبرستاني), was born in 1149 or 1150 CE (543 or 544 AH) in Ray (close to modern Tehran), whence his nisba al-Razi. Originally from Tabaristan (Amol), he traveled to Khwarazm, Transoxiana, and Khorasan. According to Ibn al-Shaʿʿār al-Mawṣilī (died 1256), one of al-Razi's earliest biographers, his great-grandfather had been a rich merchant in Mecca. Either his great-grandfather or his grandfather migrated from Mecca to Tabaristan (a mountainous region located on the Caspian coast of northern Iran) in the 11th century, and some time after that the family settled in Ray. Having been born into a family of Meccan origin, al-Razi traced his descent from the first caliph Abu Bakr (c. 573–634), and was known by medieval biographers as al-Qurashī (a member of the Quraysh, the tribe of the prophet Muhammad to which also Abu Bakr belonged). His lineage from him is recorded as per the Nuqaba of the descendants of Abu Bakr to have been;

Fakhr al-Dīn Muḥammad ibn Ḍiyāʾ al-Dīn ʿUmar ibn al-Ḥusayn ibn al-Ḥasan ibn ʿAlī ibn Muḥammad ibn ʿAbd Allāh ibn ʿAbd al-Raḥmān ibn ʿAbd al-Malik ibn ʿAbd al-Raḥmān ibn Abī Ṭāhir Muḥammad ibn Aḥmad ibn ʿAbd Allāh ibn ʿAbd al-Raḥmān ibn al-Qāsim ibn Muḥammad ibn Abī Bakr al-Ṣiddīq.

Fakhr al-Din first studied with his father, Ḍiyāʾ al-Dīn al-Makkī, himself a scholar of some repute whose magnum opus in kalam has recently been rediscovered in part, and later at Merv and Maragheh, where he was one of the pupils of Majd al-Din al-Jili, who in turn had been a disciple of al-Ghazali. He was a leading proponent of the Ash'ari school of theology.

His commentary on the Quran was the most-varied and many-sided of all extant works of the kind, comprising most of the material of importance that had previously appeared. He devoted himself to a wide range of studies and is said to have expended a large fortune on experiments in alchemy. He taught at Ray (Central Iran) and Ghazni (eastern Afghanistan), and became head of the university founded by Mohammed ibn Tukush at Herat (western Afghanistan).

In Khwārazm, debates with Muʿtazilī scholars led to unrest, forcing him to return to Rey. Later, he traveled through Transoxiana, where his works such as al-Mabāḥith al-Mashriqiyya and Sharḥ al-Ishārāt were taught. In Sarakhs, he befriended the famous physician ʿAbd al-Raḥmān b. ʿAbd al-Karīm and wrote a commentary on Ibn Sīnā's al-Qānūn for him. He married his two sons to the physician's daughters. In Bukhara, he debated prominent Ḥanafī scholars and theologians, earning great admiration. His debates with the Bāṭinīs and Karrāmīs also drew widespread attention.

He later settled in Herat in 600 AH (1203 CE). Although some sources claim he traveled to Baghdad and then Egypt, there is no reliable confirmation of this. He spent the remainder of his life in Herat, authoring works and teaching more than 300 students. Though poor in his early years, he later became wealthy, partly due to gifts from rulers and inheritance from his in-laws.

He was also renowned as an influential preacher and public speaker. According to later biographical reports, he delivered sermons in both Arabic and Persian and was often overcome with emotion while preaching, sometimes weeping. His gatherings in Herat attracted followers from different schools and sects, who attended in order to question him and engage in theological debate. It is reported that through his preaching and disputations, many members of the Karrāmiyya and others returned to Sunni doctrine. Because of his influence in Herat, he was known there by the title “Shaykh al-Islām.”

Some later sources also preserve anecdotes illustrating his rhetorical ability. One report states that during a sermon he addressed Sultan Shihāb al-Dīn with a reminder of the transient nature of worldly power, which reportedly moved the ruler to tears.

In addition to his written works, he trained many prominent students whose influence spread his intellectual legacy. Among those associated with his scholarly circle were Athīr al-Dīn al-Abharī, Tāj al-Dīn al-Urmawī, Sirāj al-Dīn al-Urmawī and Shams al-Dīn Ḥusrawshāhī, as well as later scholars among his descendants.

He died on 1 Shawwāl 606 AH (29 March 1210 CE) in Herat. He was buried near the village of Muzdāhān outside Herat.

Some historical accounts differ regarding his burial. While one tradition states that he was buried near Muzdāhān according to his will, another reports that he was actually buried in his own house and that a public burial site was presented in order to prevent possible desecration of his body by opponents.

In his later years, he also showed interest in mysticism, though this never formed a significant part of his thought. He died in Herat (Afghanistan) in 1209 (606 AH), where his tomb is still venerated today. Many believe he was poisoned by the Karrāmīyah.

== The Great Commentary ==
One of Imam Razi's outstanding achievements was his unique interpretive work on the Quran called Mafātiḥ al-Ghayb (Keys to the Unseen) and later nicknamed Tafsīr al-Kabīr (The Great Commentary), one reason being that it was 32 volumes in length. This work contains much of philosophical interest. One of his "major concerns was the self-sufficiency of the intellect." His "acknowledgment of the primacy of the Qur'an grew with his years." Al-Razi's rationalism undoubtedly "holds an important place in the debate in the Islamic tradition on the harmonization of reason and revelation."

== Development of Kalam ==
Al-Razi's development of Kalam (Islamic scholastic theology) led to the evolution and flourishing of theology among Muslims. Razi had experienced different periods in his thinking, affected by the Ash'ari school of thought and later by al-Ghazali. Al-Razi tried to make use of elements of Muʿtazila and Falsafah, and although he had some criticisms on ibn Sina, Razi was greatly affected by him. The most important instance showing the synthesis of Razi's thought may be the problem of the eternity of the world and its relation to God. He tried to reorganize the arguments of theologians and philosophers on this subject, collected and critically examined the arguments of both sides. He considered, for the most part, the philosophers' argument for the world's eternity stronger than the theologians' position of putting emphasis on the temporal nature of the world. According to Tony Street, we should not see in Razi's theoretical life a journey from a young dialectician to a religious condition. It seems that he adopted different thoughts of diverse schools, such as those of Mutazilite and Asharite, in his exegesis, The Great Commentary.

== Methodology of Qur’anic interpretation ==
Al-Rāzī developed a distinctive and systematic methodology in Qur’anic exegesis that combined rational analysis, linguistic inquiry, and theological argumentation. He maintained that apparent conflicts between reason and revelation must be resolved through interpretation (taʾwīl), since sound reason and authentic revelation ultimately cannot contradict each other. Verses that appeared to conflict with rational principles were therefore classified as ambiguous (mutashābih), and their meanings were explored through linguistic, philosophical, and theological analysis.

Although his approach emphasized rational reflection (dirāyah), al-Rāzī also made use of transmitted reports, occasions of revelation, variant Qurʾanic readings, and intertextual comparison within the Qurʾān itself. He held that the most reliable method of interpretation was to allow the Qurʾān to explain itself, while also integrating knowledge from philosophy, logic, and the natural sciences when relevant.

His exegetical method had a lasting impact on later Islamic scholarship, especially among theologians and scholars seeking to harmonize philosophical reasoning with traditional scriptural interpretation.

== Philosophical theology ==
Al-Rāzī is widely regarded as a central figure in the development of philosophical theology in Islam. Drawing on the works of Ibn Sīnā and other philosophers, he sought to integrate philosophical reasoning into the framework of Ashʿarī theology while preserving core doctrinal commitments. His synthesis marked a major shift in the discipline of kalām, transforming it into a more systematic and intellectually expansive field.

According to later historians such as Ibn Khaldūn, al-Rāzī played a decisive role in initiating the era of “philosophical kalām,” in which theological debates increasingly employed logical and metaphysical methods derived from philosophy. At the same time, he remained critical of certain philosophical doctrines, including emanation and aspects of Avicennian cosmology, and maintained a degree of intellectual independence from both theologians and philosophers.

Despite his extensive engagement with rational methods, some sources report that toward the end of his life he expressed dissatisfaction with the ability of kalām and philosophy to provide ultimate certainty in matters of faith and emphasized the primacy of the Qurʾān as a source of guidance.

== Jurisprudence (fiqh) ==
Although primarily known as a theologian and philosopher, al-Rāzī also made contributions to Islamic jurisprudence. He adhered to the Shāfiʿī school of law and interpreted legal questions according to its principles. His works in legal theory include al-Maḥṣūl fī ʿilm al-uṣūl and other writings on legal methodology, which reflect his broader engagement with rational analysis and systematic reasoning.

According to later scholars, his importance in jurisprudence lies more in his theoretical contributions to uṣūl al-fiqh (principles of jurisprudence) than in the practical application of legal rulings. He sought to integrate logical and philosophical methods into legal reasoning, thereby contributing to the intellectual development of legal theory in the post-classical period.

His legal works also demonstrate his interest in the relationship between language, reasoning, and revelation, themes that appear throughout his writings in theology and Qurʾānic exegesis.

== Sufism and spirituality ==
Although primarily associated with kalām and philosophy, al-Rāzī also displayed sympathy toward Sufism, especially in his later life. Some reports indicate that he became increasingly drawn to spiritual and mystical themes and expressed admiration for Sufi practices such as dhikr and spiritual discipline. His writings occasionally reflect an interest in inner purification and the experiential dimension of faith.

According to certain accounts, al-Rāzī may have been influenced by encounters with Sufi figures and the broader intellectual environment in which theology and mysticism interacted. While it is difficult to determine the extent of his formal affiliation with Sufi orders, later biographers describe him as showing a growing appreciation for mystical insight alongside rational inquiry.

Some sources also report that in his later years he expressed reservations about excessive reliance on rational speculation and emphasized spiritual certainty and trust in divine knowledge. Nevertheless, he did not abandon his commitment to intellectual reasoning, and his approach remained characterized by a synthesis of rational, theological, and spiritual perspectives.

== Hypothetical concept of multiple universes ==
Al-Razi, in dealing with his conception of physics and the physical world in his Matalib al-'Aliya, criticizes the idea of the geocentric model within the universe and "explores the notion of the existence of a multiverse in the context of his commentary" on the Quranic verse, "All praise belongs to God, Lord of the Worlds." He raises the question of whether the term "worlds" in this verse refers to "multiple worlds within this single universe or cosmos, or to many other universes or a multiverse beyond this known universe."

Al-Razi states:

It is established by evidence that there exists beyond the world a void without a terminal limit (khala' la nihayata laha), and it is established as well by evidence that God Most High has power over all contingent beings (al-mumkinat). Therefore He the Most High has the power (qadir) to create millions of worlds (alfa alfi 'awalim) beyond this world such that each one of those worlds be bigger and more massive than this world as well as having the like of what this world has of the throne (al-arsh), the chair (al-kursiyy), the heavens (al-samawat) and the earth (al-ard), and the sun (al-shams) and the moon (al-qamar). The arguments of the philosophers (dala'il al-falasifah) for establishing that the world is one are weak, flimsy arguments founded upon feeble premises.

Al-Razi rejected the Aristotelian and Avicennian notions of a single universe revolving around a single world. He describes their main arguments against the existence of multiple worlds or universes, pointing out their weaknesses and refuting them. This rejection arose from his affirmation of atomism, as advocated by the Ash'ari school of Islamic theology, which entails the existence of vacant space in which the atoms move, combine and separate. He discussed more on the issue of the void – the empty spaces between stars and constellations in the universe, that contain few or no stars – in greater detail in volume 5 of the Matalib. He argued that there exists an infinite outer space beyond the known world, and that God has the power to fill the vacuum with an infinite number of universes.

== List of works ==
Al-Razi had written over a hundred works on a wide variety of subjects. His major works include:

- Tafsir al-Kabir (The Great Commentary) (also known as Mafatih al-Ghayb) This tafsīr book dedicated an entire volume to Surat Al-Fatihah
- Asraar at-Tanzeel wa Anwaar at-Ta'weel (The Secrets of Revelation & The Lights of Interpretation). Tafsir of selected verses from The Quran.

Note: Not to be confused with the book of Tafsir by Imam Nasir al-Din al-Baydawi Qadi Baydawi called: Anwaar at-Tanzeel wa Asraar at-Ta'weel (The Lights of Revelation and The Secrets of Interpretation) or more commonly Tafsir al-Baydawi

- Asas al-Taqdis (The Foundation of Declaring God's Transcendence) Refutation of Ibn Khuzayma, the Karramites, and the Anthropomorphists
- 'Aja'ib al-Qur'an (The Mysteries of the Qur'an)
- Al-Bayan wa al-Burhan fi al-Radd 'ala Ahl al-Zaygh wa al-Tughyan
- Al-Mahsul fi 'Ilm al-Usul
- Al-Muwakif fi 'Ilm al-Kalam
- 'Ilm al-Akhlaq (Science of Ethics)
- Kitab al-Firasa (Book on Firasa)
- Kitab al-Mantiq al-Kabir (Major Book on Logic)
- Kitab al-nafs wa'l-ruh wa sharh quwa-huma (Book on the Soul and the Spirit and their Faculties)
- Mabahith al-mashriqiyya fi 'ilm al-ilahiyyat wa-'l-tabi'iyyat (Eastern Studies in Metaphysics and Physics)
- Al-Matālib al-'Āliyyah min al- 'ilm al-ilahī (The Higher Issues) – his last work. Al-Razi wrote al-Matālib during his writing of al-Tafsir and he died before completing both works.
- Muḥaṣṣal Afkār al-Mutaqaddimīn wal-Muta'akhkhirīn (The Harvest/Compendium of the Thought of the Ancients and Moderns)
- Nihayat al 'Uqul fi Dirayat al-Usul
- Risala al-Huduth
- Sharh al-Isharat (Commentary on al-Isharat wa-al-Tanbihat of Ibn Sina)
- Sharh Asma' Allah al-Husna (Commentary on Asma' Allah al-Husna)
- Sharh Kulliyyat al-Qanun fi al-Tibb (Commentary on Canon of Medicine)
- Sharh Nisf al-Wajiz li'l-Ghazali (Commentary on Nisf al-Wajiz of Al-Ghazali )
- Sharh Uyun al-Hikmah (Commentary on Uyun al-Hikmah)
- Kitāb al-Arba'īn Fī Uṣūl al-Dīn
- Al-Shajara al-mubaraka

== See also ==
- List of Ash'aris
- List of Muslim theologians
- List of Iranian scientists
- Astronomy in medieval Islam
- Cosmology in medieval Islam
- Abdol Hamid Khosro Shahi
- Nur al-Din al-Sabuni

== Bibliography ==
- Anawati, Georges C. (1960–2007). "Fakhr al-Dīn al-Rāzī". In Bearman, P.; Bianquis, Th.; Bosworth, C.E.; van Donzel, E.; Heinrichs, W.P. (eds.). Encyclopaedia of Islam, Second Edition. doi:10.1163/1573-3912_islam_COM_0206. (on his life and writings)
- Cannon, Byron D. (1998). "Fakhr al-Din al-Razi". In Magill, Frank N.; Moose, Christina J.; Aves, Alison; Rehn, Mark (eds.). Dictionary of World Biography. Volume 2: The Middle Ages. London and New York: Routledge. pp. 347–349. ISBN 9781579580414.
- Elkaisy-Friemuth, Maha (2016). "God and Creation in al-Rāzī's Commentary on the Qur'ān". In Taylor, Richard C.; López-Farjeat, Luis Xavier (eds.). The Routledge Companion to Islamic Philosophy. London: Routledge. pp. 7–19.
- Griffel, Frank (2007). "On Fakhr al-Dīn al-Rāzī's Life and the Patronage He Received". Journal of Islamic Studies. 18 (3): 313–344. doi:10.1093/jis/etm029.
- Griffel, Frank (2021). The Formation of Post-Classical Philosophy in Islam. New York: Oxford University Press.
- Jaffer, Tariq (2015). Rāzī: Master of Qur'ānic Interpretation and Theological Reasoning. Oxford University Press.
- Maḥmūd b. Sulaymān al-Kafawī, Katāʾib Aʿlām al-Akhyār min Fuqahāʾ Madhhab al-Nuʿmān al-Mukhtār, ed. Muṣṭafā Kūnā, al-Shākir Marwān Rashīd, Ḥasan Ūzār, and Ḥanīf Bukhārī, Istanbul, Turkey: Maktabat al-Irshād, 2017, pp. 425–428.
- Masarwa, Alev (2021). "Ibn ʿUnayn". In Fleet, Kate; Krämer, Gudrun; Matringe, Denis; Nawas, John; Rowson, Everett (eds.). Encyclopaedia of Islam, Three. doi:10.1163/1573-3912_ei3_COM_32280.
- Mourad, Yusef (1939). La physiognomie arabe et le Kitab al-firasa de Fakhr al-Din al-Razi. Paris. (on his treatise on physiognomy)
- Shihadeh, Ayman (2006). The Teleological Ethics of Fakhr al-Dīn al-Rāzī. Leiden: Brill.
- Shihadeh, Ayman (2013–2019). Shihadeh, Ayman (ed.). Fakhr al-Dīn al-Rāzī's father, Ḍiyāʾ al-Dīn al-Makkī. Nihāyat al-marām fī dirāyat al-kalām. Facsimile of the autograph manuscript of vol. II. Tehran and Berlin and Leiden: Miras-e Maktoob and Freie Universität Berlin and Brill. doi:10.1163/9789004406131. ISBN 978-90-04-40613-1.
- Shihadeh, Ayman (2017). "Al-Rāzī's (d. 1210) Commentary on Avicenna's Pointers: The Confluence of Exegesis and Aporetics". In El-Rouayheb, Khaled; Schmidtke, Sabine (eds.). The Oxford Handbook of Islamic Philosophy. Oxford University Press. pp. 296–325.
- Shihadeh, Ayman; Thiele, Jan (2020). Philosophical Theology in Islam: Later Ashʿarism East and West. Leiden and Boston: Brill.
- Ullmann, Manfred (1972). Die Natur- und Geheimwissenschaften im Islam. Handbuch der Orientalistik, Abteilung I, Ergänzungsband VI, Abschnitt 2. Leiden: E. J. Brill. pp. 388–390. (on his astrological-magical writings)
