= Nasir al-Din al-Tusi =

Persian astronomer (1201–1274)

Naṣīr al-Dīn al-Ṭūsī
- نصیرالدین طوسی
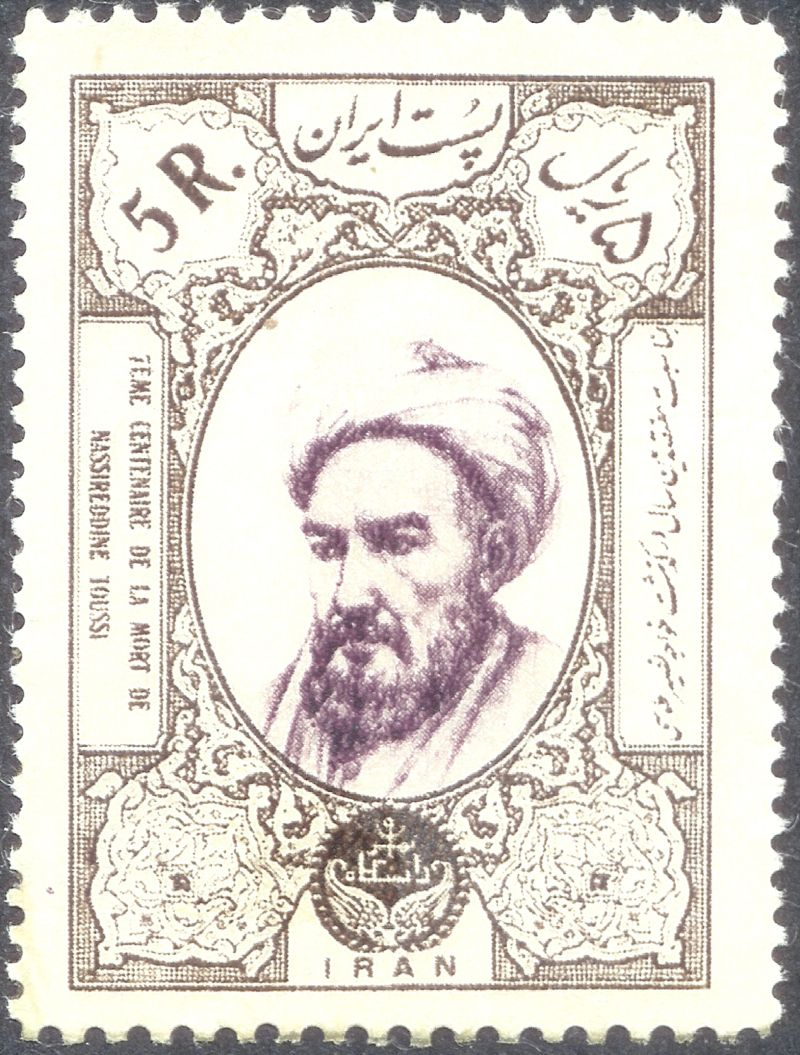
- Iranian stamp for the 700th anniversary of his death
- Title: Khawaja Nasir

Personal life
- Born: 18 February 1201; Tus, Khurasan, Khwarazmid Empire
- Died: 26 June 1274 (aged 73); Al-Kadhimiya Mosque, Kadhimiya, Baghdad, Ilkhanate
- Era: Islamic Golden Age
- Region: Persia (Iran)
- Main interest(s): Kalam, Islamic Philosophy, Astronomy, Mathematics, Biology and Medicine, Physics, Science
- Notable idea(s): Spherical trigonometry, Tusi couple
- Notable work(s): Tajrid al-I'tiqad, Zij-i ilkhani, Rawḍa-yi Taslīm, Akhlaq-i Nasiri, al-Risalah al-Asturlabiyah, Al-Tadhkirah fi 'Ilm al-Hay'ah (Memoir on the Science of Astronomy)

Religious life
- Religion: Islam
- Denomination: Shia
- Sect: Twelver
- Jurisprudence: Ja'fari

Muslim leader
- Teacher: Kamal al-Din ibn Yunus
- Students: Shams al-Din al-Bukhari
- Influenced by: Avicenna, Fakhr al-Din Razi, Mo'ayyeduddin Urdi, Siraj Qumri
- Influenced: Maitham Al Bahrani, ibn Khaldun, Qutb al-Din Shirazi, Ibn al-Shatir, Copernicus

Muḥammad ibn Muḥammad ibn al-Ḥasan al-Ṭūsī (1201–1274; AH 598–673), (Note: Persian: ابوجعفر محمد خواجه نصیرالدین طوسی) commonly known as Naṣīr al-Dīn al-Ṭūsī (Arabic: نصیر الدین الطوسی; Persian: نصیر الدین طوسی) or simply (al-)Tusi, was a Persian polymath, architect, philosopher, physician, scientist, and theologian, as well as a prominent Shi'ite scholar. He wrote extensively on mathematics, engineering, prose, mysticism, philosophy, theology, and the sciences, and is widely regarded as one of the greatest scientists of medieval Islam.

Born in Ṭūs, from which his name derives, al-Tusi later worked under an Ismāʿīlī ruler at Alamūt, the centre of the Nizārī Ismāʿīlīs, and produced Ismāʿīlī works that acquired considerable authority, although his own personal religious allegiance during this period remains uncertain. When Hūlāgū Khān and the Mongols captured Alamūt in 1256, al-Tusi entered Hūlāgū's service as an astrologer and was instrumental in saving numerous libraries from destruction.

Al-Tusi made significant contributions across several scientific disciplines. In astronomy, he compiled highly accurate tables of planetary motion, developed an improved planetary model, criticized aspects of Ptolemaic astronomy, and compiled the astronomical tables known as the Zīj al-Khānī. He also introduced the mathematical device later known as the "Ṭūsī couple". His work extended to logic, mathematics, biology, chemistry, and especially trigonometry, which he is often credited with establishing as an independent mathematical discipline rather than merely an instrument of astronomy. The Muslim historian Ibn Khaldun regarded him as the greatest of the later non-Arab scholars. His astronomical work has also been discussed as a possible influence on Copernicus and the development of Copernican heliocentrism.

A prolific author on subjects ranging across the sciences, philosophy, theology, ethics, and mysticism, al-Tusi's most enduring works include al-Akhlāq al-Nāṣiriyya ("The Nasirean Ethics", 1235) and Tajrīd al-Iʿtiqādāt ("The Definition of the Articles of Faith"). His broad intellectual output, together with his mathematical and astronomical innovations, secured his reputation as one of the major polymaths of the medieval Islamic world.

== Biography ==
Nasir al-Din Tusi was born in the city of Tus in medieval Khorasan (northeastern Iran) in the year 1201 and began his studies at an early age. In Hamadan and Tus, he studied the Qur'an, Hadith, Ja'fari jurisprudence, logic, philosophy, mathematics, medicine, and astronomy.

He was born into a Shīʿa family and lost his father at a young age. Fulfilling the wish of his father, the young Nasir took learning and scholarship very seriously and traveled far and wide to attend the lectures of renowned scholars and acquired knowledge, an exercise highly encouraged in his Islamic faith. At a young age, he moved to Nishapur to study philosophy under Farid al-Din Damad and mathematics under Muhammad Hasib. He also met Attar of Nishapur, the legendary Sufi master who was later killed by the Mongols, and he attended the lectures of Qutb al-Din al-Misri – a student of al-Razi.

Nasir-al-Din Tusi writes in his work, Desideratum of the Faithful (Maṭlūb al-muʾminīn), "To become people of spiritual reality, it is incumbent to fulfill the symbolic elucidation (ta'wīl) of the seven pillars of the religious law (sharīʿat)". He also explains that fulfilling the religious law is much easier than fulfilling its spiritual interpretation.

He explains in his book Aghaz u anjam that the sacred accounts of history that we perceive within the bounds of space and time symbolize events that have no such restrictions. They are only expressed in this way so that humans are able to comprehend them.

In Mosul, al-Tusi studied mathematics and astronomy with Kamal al-Din ibn Yunus (d. AH 639 / AD 1242), a pupil of Sharaf al-Dīn al-Ṭūsī. Later on he corresponded with Sadr al-Din al-Qunawi, the son-in-law of Ibn Arabi, and it seems that mysticism, as propagated by Sufi masters of his time, was not appealing to him. Once the occasion was suitable, he composed his own manual of philosophical Sufism in the form of a small booklet entitled Awsaf al-Ashraf, or "The Attributes of the Illustrious".

As the armies of Genghis Khan swept his homeland, he was employed by the Nizari Ismaili state and, while moving from stronghold to stronghold, made his most important contributions in science, first in those of the Quhistan region under muhtasham Nasir al-Din Abu al-Fath Abd al-Rahim ibn Abi Mansur (where he wrote the Nasirean Ethics in 1235). He was later sent to the major castles of Alamut and Maymun-Diz to continue his career under Nizari Imam Ala al-Din Muhammad. He was captured after the capitulation of Maymun-Diz to the Mongol forces under Hulegu Khan, a grandson of Genghis Khan.

Nasir al-Din Tusi’s autobiography, The Voyage (Sayr wa-Suluk) explains that a literary devastation such as the devastation of the Alamut libraries in 1256 would not waver the spirit of the Nizari Ismaili community because they give more importance to the “living book” (the Imam of the Time) rather than the “written word”. Their hearts are attached to the Commander of the Believers (amir al-mu'minin), not just the “command” itself. There is always a present living Imam in world, and following him, a believer will never go astray.

=== Role during the Mongol invasion of Baghdad ===
In 1256, al-Tusi was in the castle of Alamut when it was attacked by the forces of the Mongol leader Hulegu. Some sources claim that al-Tusi betrayed the defences of Alamut to the invading Mongols. After his forces destroyed Alamut, Hulegu, who was himself interested in the natural sciences, treated al-Tusi with great respect, appointing him as scientific adviser and a permanent member of his inner council. To great controversy, it is widely assumed Tusi was with the Mongol forces under Hulegu when they attacked and massacred the inhabitants of Baghdad in 1258 and he played an essential role in ending of the Abbasid empire. After the siege of Baghdad, he was entrusted with the administration of religious endowments and traveled extensively to both Sunni and Shiʿi institutions. In this capacity, he is credited with helping preserve religious foundations, libraries, and scholarly institutions during the period of Mongol rule. Through his scholarly and administrative influence, al-Tusi helped strengthen Twelver Shiʿi intellectual life and institutional presence in Persia and Iraq, without formally transforming the sectarian order of the state.

== Works ==
Tusi has about 150 works, of which 25 are in Persian and the remaining are in Arabic, and there is one treatise in Persian, Arabic and Turkish.

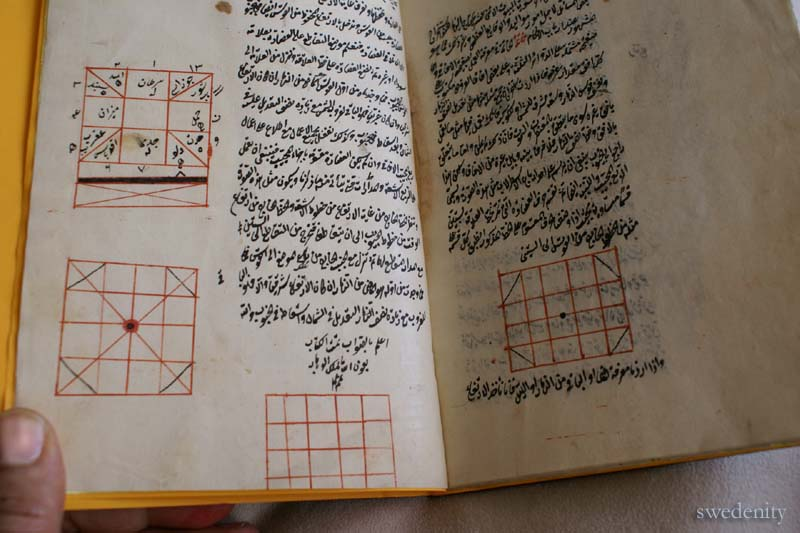
A Treatise on the Astrolabe by Tusi, Isfahan 1505

- Sayr wa-Suluk (The Voyage) – Autobiography
- Kitāb al-Shakl al-qattāʴ – Book on the complete quadrilateral. A five-volume summary of trigonometry.
- Al-Tadhkirah fi'ilm al-hay'ah – A memoir on the science of astronomy. Many commentaries were written about this work called Sharh al-Tadhkirah (A Commentary on al-Tadhkirah) – Commentaries were written by Abd al-Ali ibn Muhammad ibn al-Husayn al-Birjandi and by Nazzam Nishapuri.
- Akhlaq-i Nasiri – A work on ethics.
- al-Risalah al-Asturlabiyah – A Treatise on the astrolabe.
- Zij-i Ilkhani (Ilkhanic Tables) – A major astronomical treatise, completed in 1272.
- Sharh al-Isharat (Commentary on Avicenna's Isharat)
- Awsaf al-Ashraf – a short mystical-ethical work in Persian.
- Tajrīd al-Iʿtiqād (Summation of Belief) – A commentary on Shi'a doctrines.
- Talkhis al-Muhassal (summary of summaries).
- Maṭlūb al-muʾminīn (Desideratum of the Faithful)
- Aghaz u anjam – Esoteric interpretation of the Quran

An example from one of his poems:

Anyone who knows, and knows that he knows,
makes the steed of intelligence leap over the vault of heaven.
Anyone who does not know but knows that he does not know,
can bring his lame little donkey to the destination nonetheless.
Anyone who does not know, and does not know that he does not know,
is stuck forever in double ignorance.

== Achievements ==
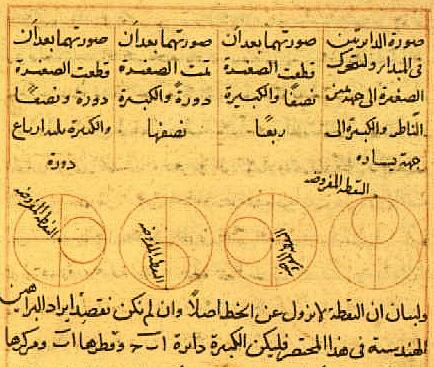
Tusi couple from Vat. Arabic ms 319

Tusi couple

During his stay in Nishapur, Tusi established a reputation as an exceptional scholar. Tusi’s prose writing, which numbers over 150 works, represents one of the largest collections by a single Islamic author. Writing in both Arabic and Persian, Nasir al-Din Tusi dealt with both religious ("Islamic") topics and non-religious or secular subjects ("the ancient sciences"). His works include the definitive Arabic versions of the works of Euclid, Archimedes, Ptolemy, Autolycus, and Theodosius of Bithynia.

=== Astronomy ===
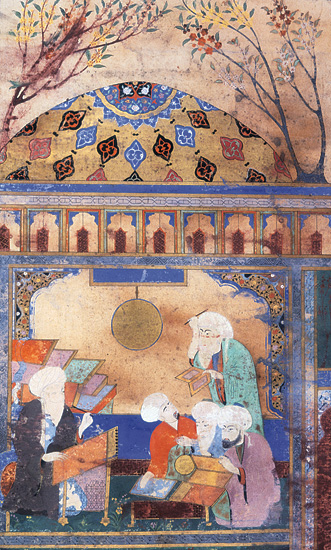
The Astronomical Observatory of Nasir al-Dīn Tusi.

Tusi convinced Hulegu Khan to construct an observatory for establishing accurate astronomical tables for better astrological predictions. Beginning in 1259, the Rasad Khaneh observatory was constructed in Azarbaijan, south of the river Aras, and to the west of Maragheh, the capital of the Ilkhanate Empire.

Based on observations made there, Tusi compiled tables of planetary movements in his book Zij-i ilkhani (Ilkhanic Tables). This book contains astronomical tables for calculating the positions of the planets and the names of the stars. Historian F. Jamil Ragep calls the Zij-i Ilkhani "not particularly original or innovative", but says Tusi's planetary theory "had an enormous influence upon late medieval Islamic astronomy" and on European astronomers including Copernicus. His famous student Shams al-Din al-Bukhari was the teacher of Byzantine scholar Gregory Chioniades, who had in turn trained astronomer Manuel Bryennios about 1300 in Constantinople.

For his planetary models, he invented a geometrical technique called a Tusi-couple, which generates linear motion from the sum of two circular motions. He used this technique to replace Ptolemy's problematic equant for many planets, but found no solution for Mercury, which Ibn al-Shatir and Ali Qushji later supplied. The Tusi couple was later employed in Ibn al-Shatir's geocentric model and Nicolaus Copernicus' heliocentric Copernican model. He also calculated a value of 51 arcseconds for the annual precession of the equinoxes and contributed to the construction and usage of some astronomical instruments including the astrolabe.

Ṭūsī criticized Ptolemy's use of observational evidence to show that the Earth was at rest, noting that such proofs were not decisive. He did not conclude that the Earth moves: he and his 16th-century commentator al-Bīrjandī held that its immobility could be demonstrated only by physical principles found in natural philosophy. Tusi's criticisms of Ptolemy were similar to the arguments later used by Copernicus in 1543 to defend the Earth's rotation.

On the nature of the Milky Way, Ṭūsī wrote in his Tadhkira: "The Milky Way, i.e. the galaxy, is made up of a very large number of small, tightly-clustered stars, which, on account of their concentration and smallness, seem to be cloudy patches. Because of this, it was likened to milk in color." Three centuries later the proof of the Milky Way consisting of many stars came in 1610 when Galileo Galilei used a telescope to study the Milky Way and discovered that it is really composed of a huge number of faint stars.

=== Logic ===
Nasir al-Din Tusi was a supporter of Avicennian logic, and wrote the following commentary on Avicenna's theory of absolute propositions:

"What spurred him to this was that in the assertoric syllogistic Aristotle and others sometimes used contradictories of absolute propositions on the assumption that they are absolute; and that was why so many decided that absolutes did contradict absolutes. When Avicenna had shown this to be wrong, he wanted to develop a method of construing those examples from Aristotle."

=== Mathematics ===
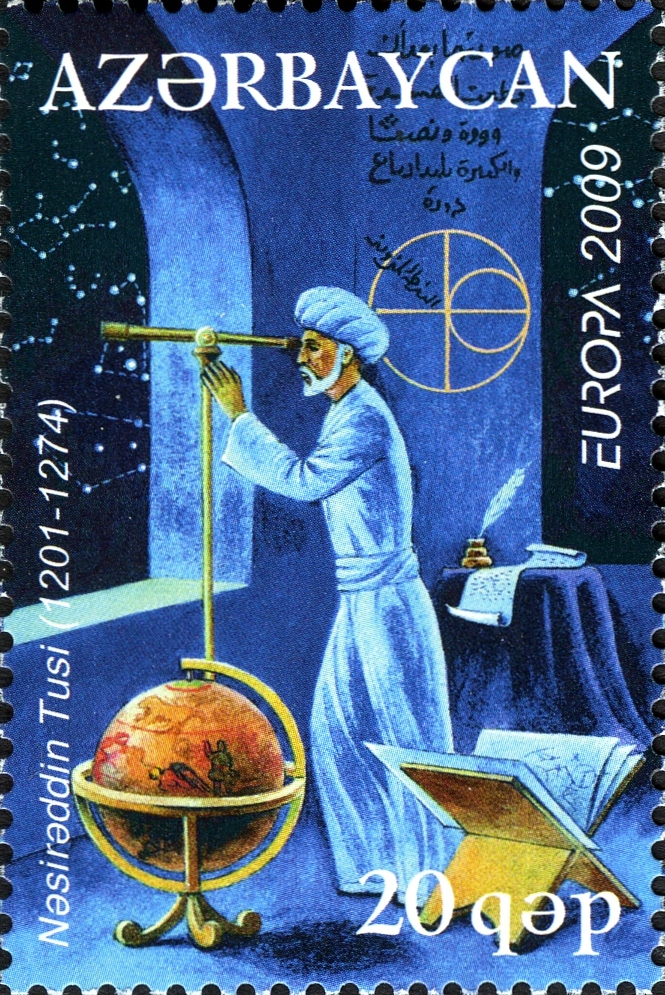
A stamp issued in the republic of Azerbaijan in 2009 honoring Tusi

Al-Tusi was the first to write a work on trigonometry independently of astronomy. Al-Tusi, in his Treatise on the Quadrilateral, gave an extensive exposition of spherical trigonometry, distinct from astronomy. It was in the works of Al-Tusi that trigonometry achieved the status of an independent branch of pure mathematics distinct from astronomy, to which it had been linked for so long.

He was the first to list the six distinct cases of a right triangle in spherical trigonometry.

This followed earlier work by Greek mathematicians such as Menelaus of Alexandria, who wrote a book on spherical trigonometry called Sphaerica, and the earlier Muslim mathematicians Abū al-Wafā' al-Būzjānī and al-Jayyani.

His On the Sector Figure contains the law of sines for plane triangles.

$$\frac{a}{\sin A} = \frac{b}{\sin B} = \frac{c}{\sin C}$$

He also stated the sine law for spherical triangles, discovered the law of tangents for spherical triangles, and provided proofs for these laws.

=== Color theory ===
While Aristotle (d. 322 BCE) had suggested that all colors can be aligned on a single line from black to white, Ibn-Sina (d. 1037) described that there were three paths from black to white, one path via grey, a second path via red and the third path via green. Al-Tusi (ca. 1258) stated that there are no less than five of such paths, via lemon (yellow), blood (red), pistachio (green), indigo (blue) and grey. This text, which was copied in the Middle East numerous times until at least the nineteenth century as part of the textbook Revision of the Optics (Tanqih al-Manazir) by Kamal al-Din al-Farisi (d. 1320), made color space effectively two-dimensional. Before Al-Tusi, Robert Grosseteste (d. 1253) had proposed an effectively three-dimensional model of color space.

=== Biology ===
In his Akhlaq-i Nasiri, Tusi wrote about several biological topics. He defended a version of Aristotle's scala naturae, in which he placed man above animals, plants, minerals, and the elements. He described "grasses which grow without sowing or cultivation, by the mere mingling of elements," as closest to minerals. Among plants, he considered the date-palm as the most highly developed, since "it only lacks one thing further to reach (the stage of) an animal: to tear itself loose from the soil and to move away in the quest for nourishment."

The lowest animals "are adjacent to the region of plants: such are those animals which propagate like grass, being incapable of mating [...], e.g. earthworms, and certain insects". The animals "which reach the stage of perfection [...] are distinguished by fully developed weapons", such as antlers, horns, teeth, and claws. Tusi described these organs as adaptations to each species's lifestyle. He continued:

"The noblest of the species is that one whose sagacity and perception is such that it accepts discipline and instruction: thus there accrues to it the perfection not originally created in it. Such are the schooled horse and the trained falcon. The greater this faculty grows in it, the more surpassing its rank, until a point is reached where the (mere) observation of action suffices as instruction: thus, when they see a thing, they perform the like of it by mimicry, without training [...]. This is the utmost of the animal degrees, and the first of the degrees of Man in contiguous therewith."

Tusi seems to have perceived man as belonging to the animals, since he stated that "the Animal Soul [comprising the faculties of perception and movement ...] is restricted to individuals of the animal species", and that, by possessing a "Human Soul, [...] mankind is distinguished and particularized among other animals."

By Tusi's own account, this part of the book covers "the gist" of Ibn Miskawayh's ethics. In 1918 Isma'il Mazhar, Darwin's Arabic translator, presented Ibn Miskawayh's ladder of beings, from minerals through the date palm and apes to man, as anticipating evolution. Farid Alakbarli made the same claim for Tusi in 2001. Paul Braterman, comparing its quotations with Wickens's translation, found no evolution there and called the reading an "unjustified back-projection onto what is an essentially Aristotelian view of the transformations of matter". Shoaib Ahmed Malik argues that such medieval texts describe the great chain of being, a fixed hierarchy in which no species becomes another.

=== Mineralogy ===
Tusi wrote a treatise on mineralogy, the Tansukh-nama-yi Ilkhani.

=== Philosophy ===
Tusi contributed many writings to the topic of philosophy. He defended Avicenna's logic and philosophy, and wrote a commentary on Avicenna's Isharat. His most famous philosophical work is Akhlaq-i nasiri or Nasirean Ethics in English. Within this work he discusses and compares Islamic teachings to the ethics of Aristotle and Plato. Tusi's book became a popular ethical work in the Muslim world, specifically in India and Persia. Tusi's work also left an impact on Shi'ite Islamic theology. His Tajrid al-I'tiqad, which has attracted over 400 commentaries, is significant in Shi'ite theology. He also wrote five works on logic, which were highly regarded by his contemporaries and achieved prominence in the Muslim world.

== Influence and legacy ==
A 60-km diameter lunar crater located on the southern hemisphere of the moon is named after him as "Nasireddin". A minor planet 10269 Tusi discovered by Soviet astronomer Nikolai Stepanovich Chernykh in 1979 is named after him. The K. N. Toosi University of Technology in Iran and Observatory of Shamakhy in the Republic of Azerbaijan are also named after him. In February 2013, Google celebrated his 812th birthday with a doodle, which was accessible in its websites with Arabic language calling him al-farsi (the Persian). His birthday is also celebrated as Engineer's Day in Iran.

=== Possible influence on Copernicus ===
Some scholars believe that Nicolaus Copernicus may have been influenced by Middle Eastern astronomers due to uncanny similarities between his work and the uncited work of these Islamic scholars, including Nasir al-Din al-Tusi, Ibn al-Shatir, Muayyad al-Din al-Urdi, and Qutb al-Din al-Shirazi. al-Tusi specifically, the plagiarism in question comes from similarities in the Tusi couple and Copernicus' geometric method of removing the Equant from mathematical astronomy. Not only do both of the methods match geometrically, however, more importantly they both use the same exact lettering system for each vertex; a detail that seems too preternatural to be happenstance. Moreover, the fact that several other details of his model also mirror other Islamic scholars bolsters the notion that Copernicus' work may not have been only his own.

There is no evidence that any of the direct work of Nasir al-Din al-Tusi ever made it to Copernicus, however there is evidence that the mathematics and theories did make the journey to Europe. There were Jewish scientists and pilgrims who would make the journey from the Middle East to Europe, bringing with them Middle Eastern scientific ideas to share with their Christian counterparts. While this is not direct evidence that Copernicus has access to al-Tusi's work, it does show that it was possible. There was just such a Jewish scholar by the name of Abner of Burgos who wrote a book containing an incomplete version of the Tusi couple that he had learned second hand, which could have been found by Copernicus. His version had no proofs of the geometry either, so if Copernicus had obtained this book he would have had to complete both the proof and mechanism. Additionally, some scholars believe that, if not Jewish thinkers, it could have been transmission from the Islamic school in Maragheh, home to Nasir al-Din al-Tusi's observatory to Muslim Spain. From Spain, al-Tusi and other Islamic cosmological theories could spread through Europe. Spread of Islamic astronomy from Maragheh Observatory into Europe could have also been possible in the form of Greek translations from Gregory Choniades. There is evidence as to the means of Copernicus acquiring the Tusi couple and suspicious similarities, not only in math but in visual details as well.

Despite this circumstantial evidence, there is still no direct proof that Copernicus did plagiarize the work of Nasir al-Din al-Tusi, and if he did that he did so intentionally. The Tusi couple is not a unique principle, and as the equant was a problematic necessity to preserve circular motion it is possible that more than one astronomer wished to improve on it; to that end, some scholars argue it would not be difficult for an astronomer to use Euclid's own work to derive the Tusi couple on their own, and that Copernicus most likely did this instead of stealing. Before Copernicus ever published the work on his geometrical mechanism, he had written at length his dissatisfaction over Ptolemaic astronomy and the use of the equant, so some scholars then purport that it was not unfounded for Copernicus to have rederived the Tusi couple without having seen it as he had clear motive to do so. Also, some scholars that argue Copernicus did commit plagiarism say that by never claiming it as his own, he inherently condemns himself. However, others critique that mathematicians do not normally claim work like other scientists, so declaring a theorem for oneself is an exception and not the norm. Therefore, there is motive and some explanation as to why and how Copernicus did not plagiarize, despite the evidence against him.

== In popular culture ==
- A fictionalized version of al-Tusi features in the 2021 manga series A Witch's Life in Mongol by Tomato Soup. He is only known as Muhammad and is portrayed as a child prodigy and a childhood friend of the protagonist Fatima, a figure who historically also hailed from Tus, known for being a slave and later political advisor to the Mongol regent Töregene Khatun. The series was adapted into an anime television series in 2026.

== See also ==
- List of Iranian scientists
- List of Shi'a Muslims
- Persian science
- Science in the medieval Islamic world
- Shen Kuo
