= Ayman Shihadeh =

Intellectual historian of the Islamic world

- Occupation: Historian
- Known for: In 2019, he co-chaired and later chaired the British Association for Islamic Studies, as well as establishing and chairing the BRAIS-De Gruyter Prize in the Study of Islam and the Muslim World.

Ayman Shihadeh is an intellectual historian of the Islamic world and Professor in Arabic intellectual history at the School of Oriental and African Studies (SOAS), University of London.

== Biography ==
Shihadeh finished his postgraduate studies at the University of Oxford in 2002 after earning a first-class BA with honours from SOAS, and went on to teach at the Universities of Edinburgh, Exeter, and Glasgow before joining the School of Oriental and African Studies of the University of London in 2008. He was given a two-year senior humanities research fellowship at New York University Abu Dhabi, from 2019 to 2021. Between 2012 and 2019, he co-chaired and later chaired the British Association for Islamic Studies, as well as establishing and chairing the BRAIS-De Gruyter Prize in the Study of Islam and the Muslim World.

== Works ==
- The Teleological Ethics of Fakhr Al-Dīn Al-Rāzī
- Doubts on Avicenna: A Study and Edition of Sharaf Al-Dīn Al-Masʿūdī’s Commentary on the Ishārāt
