= Mohy al-Din =

Mohy al-Din (Arabic: محيي الدین, ALA-LC: Muḥyī al-Dīn) is a male Muslim name composed of the elements Muhyi, meaning "reviver", and ad-Din, meaning "of the faith". Notable people with the name include:

== People ==
=== Given name ===
- Mohi-Din Binhendi, Emirati businessman
- Mohie El Din El Ghareeb (born 1933), Egyptian, economist, politician, and businessman
- Mohiddin Badsha II (1933–1989), Indian yogi
- Mohiddin Mohamed Kulmiye (1958–1991), Somali marathon runner
- Mohieddin Fikini (1925–1994), Libyan politician, Prime Minister of Libya
- Mohieddin El-Sas (born 1950), Syrian wrestler
- Mohieddine Beni Daoud (born 1976), Tunisian racewalker
- Mohideen Baig (1919–1991), Sri Lankan musician
- Mohydeen Izzat Quandour (1938–2023), Jordanian writer
- Mohyeldin Elzein (1943–2007), Sudanese doctor
- Mohyeldin Ramadan Hussein (born 1969), Egyptian wrestler
- Mohiuddin Ahmed, multiple people
- Mohiuddin Ahmad Alamgir (born 1950), better known as simply Alamgir, Bangladeshi actor
- Mohiuddin Bava, Indian politician
- Mohiuddin Farooque (1954–1997), Bangladeshi lawyer and environmentalist
- Mohiuddin Faroque (died 2020), Bangladeshi art director
- Mohiuddin Hajni (1917–1993), Kashmiri writer
- Mohiuddin Jahangir (1948–1971), Bangladesh army officer, awarded Bir Sreshtho
- Mohiuddin Maharaj (born 1976), Bangladeshi politician
- Mohiuddin Mahdi (died 1676), Bangladeshi Sufi saint
- Mohiuddin Malik (1936–2012), Indian politician
- Mohiuddin Nawab (1930–2016), Pakistani novelist
- Mohiuddin Shabnam (1935–2009), Afghan painter
- Mohiuddin Ibnul Siraji (born 1985), Bangladeshi footballer
- Mohiuddin Tareq (born 2003), Bangladeshi cricketer
- Mohiuddin Qadri Zore (1905–1962), Indian writer
- Mohiyedine Sharif (1966–1998), Palestinian terrorist

=== Middlename ===
- A. B. M. Mohiuddin Chowdhury (1944–2017), Bangladeshi politician
- Hossein Mohyeddin Elāhi Ghomshei, or just Hossein Elahi Ghomshei (born 1940), Iranian writer
- Sami Mohy El Din Muhammed Al Hajj, or just Sami al-Hajj (born 1968), Sudanese journalist held in Guantanamo
- Seyed Mohyeddin Seghatoleslam (born 1960), Persian Architect
- T. P. M. Mohideen Khan (born 1947), Indian politician
- Zia Mohiuddin Dagar (1929–1990), Indian musician

=== Surname ===
- Ahmad Fuad Mohieddin (1926–1984), Egyptian politician, Prime Minister of Egypt
- Ahmed Mohiuddin (1923–1998), Pakistani scientist
- Akhtar Mohiuddin, Pakistani football coach
- Ayman Mohyeldin (born 1979), Egyptian-American journalist
- Cauder Mohideen (active 1795), first Kapitan Keling of Penang
- Ghulam Mohiuddin (actor) (born 1951), Pakistani actor
- Khaled Mohieddin (1922–2018), Egyptian politician and soldier
- Makhdoom Mohiuddin (1908–1969), Indian Urdu poet and political activist
- Sherif Mohie El Din (born 1964), Egyptian conductor and composer
- Zakaria Mohieddin (1918–2012), Egyptian military officer, politician, Prime Minister of Egypt
- Zia Mohyeddin (1931–2023), Pakistani actor

== See also ==
- Ghulam Mohiuddin (disambiguation), compound name
- Muhiddin, Turkish surname
- Mohyeddin, given name
- Seyed Mohyeddin, name
- Mohyeddin, given name / middle name / surname
