= Heliocentrism =

Sun-centered astronomical model

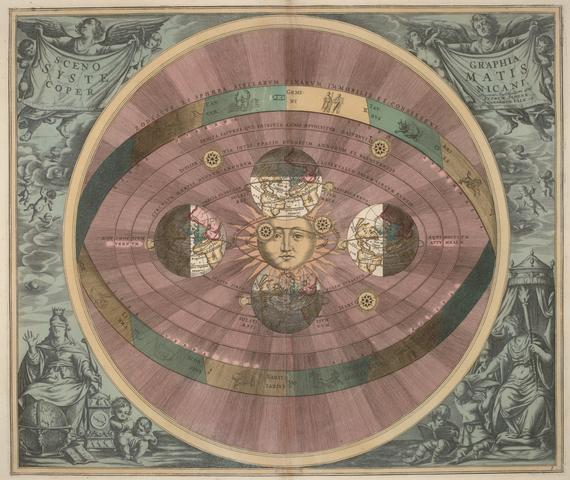
Andreas Cellarius's illustration of the Copernican system, from the Harmonia Macrocosmica

Heliocentrism (Note: Optionally capitalised, Heliocentrism or heliocentrism, according to The Shorter Oxford English Dictionary (6th ed., 2007). The term is a learned formation based on Greek Helios (ἥλιος) "Sun" and kentron (κέντρον) "center"; the adjective heliocentric is first recorded in English (as heliocentrick) in 1685, after Neo-Latin heliocentricus, in use from about the same time (as in Johann Jakob Zimmermann, Prodromus biceps cono ellipticæ et a priori demonstratæ planetarum theorices, 1679). The abstract noun in -ism is more recent, recorded from the late 19th century (e.g. in Constance Naden, Induction and Deduction: A Historical and Critical Sketch of Successive Philosophical Conceptions Respecting the Relations Between Inductive and Deductive Thought and Other Essays), modelled after German Heliocentrismus or Heliozentrismus (c. 1870).) (also known as the heliocentric model) is a superseded astronomical model that placed the Sun at the center of the universe, with the Earth and the planets in its orbit. It superseded geocentrism, which placed the Earth at the center of the universe. In modern astronomy, heliocentrism has been superseded by models based on relativity, in which the universe does not have an absolute center or preferred frames of reference.

Historically, heliocentrism was opposed to geocentrism, which placed Earth at the center. The idea that Earth revolves around the Sun was proposed as early as the 3rd century BC by Aristarchus of Samos, who had been influenced by Philolaus's 5th-century BC concept that Earth was spherical and revolving around a "mystical" central fire that regulated the universe. In medieval Europe, however, Aristarchus's heliocentrism attracted little attention—possibly because of the loss of scientific works of the Hellenistic period. (Note: According to Lucio Russo, the heliocentric view was expounded in Hipparchus' work on gravity.)

It was not until the 16th century that a mathematical model of a virtually heliocentric system was presented by the Renaissance mathematician, astronomer, and Catholic cleric Nicolaus Copernicus, leading to the Copernican Revolution. In the following century, Johannes Kepler introduced elliptical orbits for all planets discovered up to his time (genuinely heliocentric), and Galileo Galilei presented observations of the Solar System made using his telescope.

With the observations of William Herschel, Friedrich Bessel, and other astronomers, it was realized that the Sun, while near the barycenter of the Solar System, was not central in the universe. Modern astronomy does not distinguish any universal center. After these discoveries, informal language still holds to the remaining truth value of the term, narrowed to the scope of our planetary system.

== Ancient and medieval astronomy ==
While the sphericity of Earth was widely recognized in Greco-Roman astronomy from at least the 4th century BC, Earth's daily rotation and yearly orbit around the Sun was never universally accepted until the Copernican Revolution.

While a moving Earth was proposed at least from the 4th century BCE in Pythagoreanism, and a fully developed heliocentric model was developed by Aristarchus of Samos in the 3rd century BCE, these ideas were not successful in replacing the view of a stationary spherical Earth, and from the 2nd century CE the predominant model, which would be inherited by medieval astronomy, was the geocentric model described in Ptolemy's Almagest.

The movements of the Moon, the planets, and the Sun around the static Earth in the Ptolemaic geocentric model (upper panel) in comparison to the orbits of the planets and the daily-rotating Earth around the Sun in the Copernican heliocentric model (lower panel). In both models, the Moon rotates around Earth.

=== Classical antiquity ===
==== Pythagoreans ====
The first non-geocentric model of the universe was proposed by the Pythagorean philosopher Philolaus (d. 390 BCE), who taught that at the center of the universe was a "central fire", around which Earth, the Sun, the Moon, and planets revolved in uniform circular motion. This system postulated the existence of a Counter-Earth collinear with Earth and central fire, with the same period of revolution around the central fire as Earth. The Sun revolved around the central fire once a year, and the stars were stationary. Earth maintained the same hidden face towards the central fire, rendering both it and the "Counter-Earth" invisible from Earth. The Pythagorean concept of uniform circular motion remained unchallenged for approximately the next 2000 years, and it was to the Pythagoreans that Copernicus referred to show that the notion of a moving Earth was neither new nor revolutionary. Kepler gave an alternative explanation of the Pythagoreans' "central fire" as the Sun, "as most sects purposely hid[e] their teachings".

Heraclides of Pontus (4th century BCE) said that the rotation of Earth explained the apparent daily motion of the celestial sphere. It used to be thought that he believed Mercury and Venus to revolve around the Sun, which in turn (along with the other planets) revolves around Earth. Macrobius (CE 395—423) later described this as the "Egyptian System," stating that "it did not escape the skill of the Egyptians," though there is no other evidence it was known in ancient Egypt.

==== Aristarchus of Samos ====
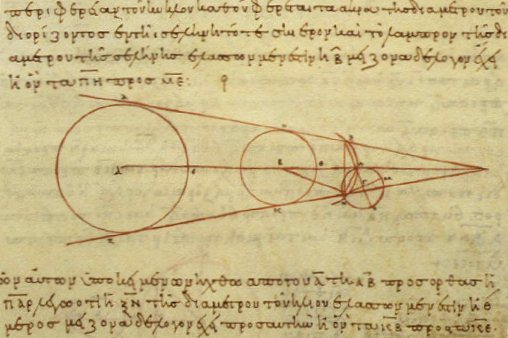
Aristarchus' 3rd century BCE calculations on the relative sizes of Earth, the Sun, and the Moon, from a 10th-century CE Greek copy

The first person known to have proposed a heliocentric system was Aristarchus of Samos (c. 270 BCE). Like his contemporary Eratosthenes, Aristarchus calculated the size of Earth and measured the sizes and distances of the Sun and Moon. From his estimates, he concluded that the Sun was six to seven times wider than Earth, and thought that the larger object would have the most attractive force.

His writings on the heliocentric system are lost, but some information about them is known from a brief description by his contemporary, Archimedes, and from scattered references by later writers. Archimedes' description of Aristarchus' theory is given in the former's book, The Sand Reckoner. The entire description comprises just three sentences, which Thomas Heath translates as follows:

You are aware ['you' being King Gelon] that "universe" is the name given by most astronomers to the sphere, the centre of which is the centre of the earth, while its radius is equal to the straight line between the centre of the sun and the centre of the earth. This is the common account (τὰ γραφόμενα), as you have heard from astronomers. But Aristarchus brought out a book consisting of certain hypotheses, wherein it appears, as a consequence of the assumptions made, that the universe is many times greater than the "universe" just mentioned. His hypotheses are that the fixed stars and the sun remain unmoved, that the earth revolves about the sun in the circumference of a circle, the sun lying in the middle of the orbit, and that the sphere of the fixed stars, situated about the same centre as the sun, is so great that the circle in which he supposes the earth to revolve bears such a proportion to the distance of the fixed stars as the centre of the sphere bears to its surface.

— The Sand Reckoner (Arenarius I, 4–7)

Aristarchus presumably took the stars to be very far away since if Earth's orbit were significant relative to the size of the celestial sphere, the apparent angular separations between the stars would vary over the course of the year. The stars are in fact so far away that stellar parallax only became detectable when sufficiently powerful telescopes had been developed in the 1830s.

No references to Aristarchus' heliocentrism are known in any other writings from before the common era. The earliest of the handful of other ancient references occur in two passages from the writings of Plutarch. These mention one detail not stated explicitly in Archimedes' account—namely, that Aristarchus' theory had Earth rotating on an axis. The first of these references occurs in Concerning the Face Which Appears in the Orb of the Moon:

Only do not, my good fellow, enter an action against me for impiety in the style of Cleanthes, who thought it was the duty of Greeks to indict Aristarchus of Samos on the charge of impiety for putting in motion the Hearth of the Universe, this being the effect of his attempt to save the phenomena by supposing the heaven to remain at rest and the earth to revolve in an oblique circle, while it rotates, at the same time, about its own axis.

— Concerning the Face Which Appears in the Orb of the Moon (De facie in orbe lunae, c. 6, pp. 922 F – 923 A.)

Only scattered fragments of Cleanthes' writings have survived in quotations by other writers, but in Lives and Opinions of Eminent Philosophers, Diogenes Laërtius lists A reply to Aristarchus (Πρὸς Ἀρίσταρχον) as one of Cleanthes' works, and some scholars have suggested that this might have been where Cleanthes had accused Aristarchus of impiety.

The second of the references by Plutarch is in his Platonic Questions:

Did Plato put the earth in motion, as he did the sun, the moon, and the five planets, which he called the instruments of time on account of their turnings, and was it necessary to conceive that the earth "which is globed about the axis stretched from pole to pole through the whole universe" was not represented as being held together and at rest, but as turning and revolving (στρεφομένην καὶ ἀνειλουμένην), as Aristarchus and Seleucus afterwards maintained that it did, the former stating this as only a hypothesis (ὑποτιθέμενος μόνον), the latter as a definite opinion (καὶ ἀποφαινόμενος)?

— Platonic Questions (Platonicae Quaestiones viii. I, 1006 C)

The remaining references to Aristarchus' heliocentrism are extremely brief, and provide no more information beyond what can be gleaned from those already cited. Ones which mention Aristarchus explicitly by name occur in Aëtius' Opinions of the Philosophers, Sextus Empiricus' Against the Mathematicians, and an anonymous scholiast to Aristotle. Another passage in Aëtius' Opinions of the Philosophers reports that Seleucus the astronomer had affirmed Earth's motion, but does not mention Aristarchus.

==== Seleucus of Seleucia ====
Since Plutarch mentions the "followers of Aristarchus" in passing, it is likely that there were other astronomers in the Classical period who also espoused heliocentrism, but whose work was lost. The only other astronomer from antiquity known by name who is known to have supported Aristarchus' heliocentric model was Seleucus of Seleucia (b. 190 BCE ), a Hellenistic astronomer who flourished a century after Aristarchus in the Seleucid Empire. Seleucus was a proponent of the heliocentric system of Aristarchus. Seleucus may have proved the heliocentric theory by determining the constants of a geometric model for the heliocentric theory and developing methods to compute planetary positions using this model. He may have used early trigonometric methods that were available in his time, as he was a contemporary of Hipparchus. A fragment of a work by Seleucus has survived in Arabic translation, which was referred to by Rhazes (b. 865).

Alternatively, his explanation may have involved the phenomenon of tides, which he supposedly theorized to be caused by the attraction to the Moon and by the revolution of Earth around Earth and the Moon's center of mass.

==== Late antiquity ====
There were occasional speculations about heliocentrism in Europe before Copernicus. In Roman Carthage, the pagan Martianus Capella (5th century CE) expressed the opinion that the planets Venus and Mercury did not go about Earth but instead circled the Sun. Capella's model was discussed in the Early Middle Ages by various anonymous 9th-century commentators and Copernicus mentions him as an influence on his own work. Also Macrobius (420 CE) described a heliocentric model.

=== Ancient India ===
Aryabhata (476–550), in his magnum opus Aryabhatiya (499), propounded a planetary model in which Earth was taken to be spinning on its axis and the periods of the planets were given with respect to the Sun. His immediate commentators, such as Lalla, and other later authors, rejected his innovative view about the turning Earth. It has been argued that Aryabhatta's calculations were based on an underlying heliocentric model, in which the planets orbit the Sun, although this has also been rebutted. The general consensus is that a synodic anomaly (depending on the position of the Sun) does not imply a physically heliocentric orbit (such corrections being also present in late Babylonian astronomical texts), and that Aryabhata's system was not explicitly heliocentric. He also made many astronomical calculations, such as the times of the solar and lunar eclipses, and the instantaneous motion of the Moon. Early followers of Aryabhata's model included Varahamihira, Brahmagupta, and Bhaskara II.

=== Medieval Islamic world ===
For a time, Muslim astronomers accepted the Ptolemaic system and the geocentric model, which were used by al-Battani to show that the distance between the Sun and Earth varies. In the 10th century, al-Sijzi accepted that Earth rotates around its axis. According to later astronomer al-Biruni, al-Sijzi invented an astrolabe called al-zūraqī based on a belief held by some of his contemporaries that the apparent motion of the stars was due to Earth's movement, and not that of the firmament. Islamic astronomers began to criticize the Ptolemaic model, including Ibn al-Haytham in his Al-Shukūk 'alā Baṭalamiyūs ("Doubts Concerning Ptolemy", c. 1028), who found contradictions in Ptolemy's model, but al-Haytham remained committed to a geocentric model.

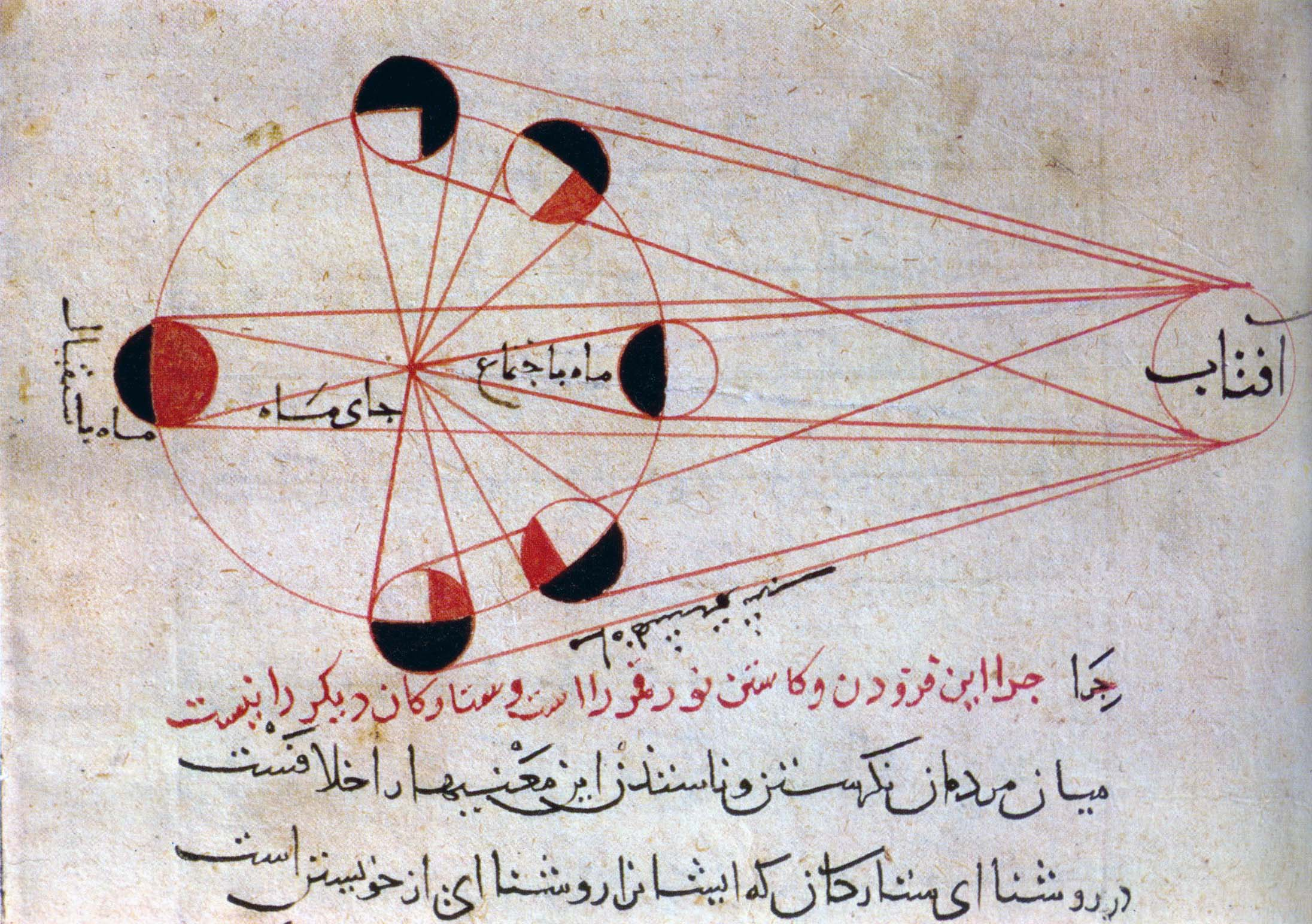
An illustration from al-Biruni's astronomical works explains the different phases of the Moon with respect to the position of the Sun.

Al-Biruni discussed the possibility of whether Earth rotated about its own axis and orbited the Sun, but in his Masudic Canon (1031), he expressed his faith in a geocentric and stationary Earth. He was aware that if Earth rotated on its axis, it would be consistent with his astronomical observations, but considered it a problem of natural philosophy rather than one of mathematics.

In the 12th century, non-heliocentric alternatives to the Ptolemaic system were developed by some Islamic astronomers, such as Nur ad-Din al-Bitruji, who considered the Ptolemaic model mathematical, and not physical. His system spread throughout most of Europe in the 13th century, with debates and refutations of his ideas continued to the 16th century.

The Maragha school of astronomy in Ilkhanid-era Persia further developed "non-Ptolemaic" planetary models involving Earth's rotation. Notable astronomers of this school are Al-Urdi (d. 1266) Al-Katibi (d. 1277), and Al-Tusi (d. 1274).

The arguments and evidence used resemble those used by Copernicus to support Earth's motion. The criticism of Ptolemy as developed by Averroes and by the Maragha school explicitly address Earth's rotation but it did not arrive at explicit heliocentrism. The observations of the Maragha school were further improved at the Timurid-era Samarkand Observatory under Qushji (1403–1474).

=== Medieval India ===
In India, Nilakantha Somayaji (1444–1544), in his Aryabhatiyabhasya, a commentary on Aryabhata's Aryabhatiya, developed a computational system for a geo-heliocentric planetary model, in which the planets orbit the Sun, which in turn orbits Earth, similar to the system later proposed by Tycho Brahe. In the Tantrasamgraha (1501), Somayaji further revised his planetary system, which was mathematically more accurate at predicting the heliocentric orbits of the interior planets than both the Tychonic and Copernican models, but did not propose any specific models of the universe. Nilakantha's planetary system also incorporated Earth's rotation on its axis. Most astronomers of the Kerala school of astronomy and mathematics seem to have accepted his planetary model.

== Renaissance-era astronomy ==
=== Medieval period ===
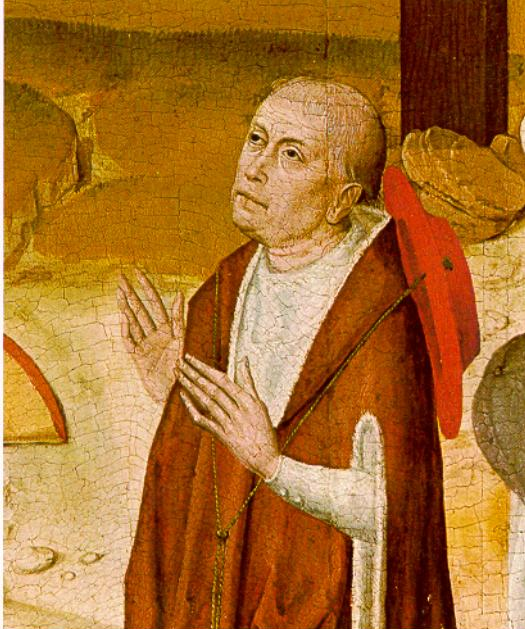
Nicholas of Cusa, 15th century, asked whether there was any reason to assert that any point was the center of the universe.

Martianus Capella (5th century CE) expressed the opinion that the planets Venus and Mercury did not go about Earth but instead circled the Sun. Capella's model was discussed in the Early Middle Ages by various anonymous 9th-century commentators and Copernicus mentions him as an influence on his own work. Macrobius (420 CE) described a heliocentric model. John Scotus Eriugena (815-877 CE) proposed a model reminiscent of that from Tycho Brahe.

In the 14th century, bishop Nicole Oresme discussed the possibility that Earth rotated on its axis, while Cardinal Nicholas of Cusa in his Learned Ignorance asked whether there was any reason to assert that the Sun (or any other point) was the center of the universe. In parallel to a mystical definition of God, Cusa wrote that "Thus the fabric of the world (machina mundi) will quasi have its center everywhere and circumference nowhere," recalling Hermes Trismegistus.

Some historians maintain that the thought of the Maragheh observatory, in particular the mathematical devices known as the Urdi lemma and the Tusi couple, influenced Renaissance-era European astronomy, and thus was indirectly received by Renaissance-era European astronomy and thus by Copernicus. Copernicus used such devices in the same planetary models as found in Arabic sources. The exact replacement of the equant by two epicycles used by Copernicus in the Commentariolus was found in an earlier work by Ibn al-Shatir (d. c. 1375) of Damascus. Copernicus' lunar and Mercury models are also identical to Ibn al-Shatir's.

While the influence of the criticism of Ptolemy by Averroes on Renaissance thought is clear and explicit, the claim of direct influence of the Maragha school, postulated by Otto E. Neugebauer in 1957, remains an open question. Since the Tusi couple was used by Copernicus in his reformulation of mathematical astronomy, there is a growing consensus that he became aware of this idea in some way. One possible route of transmission may have been through Byzantine science, which translated some of al-Tusi's works from Arabic into Byzantine Greek. Several Byzantine Greek manuscripts containing the Tusi couple are still extant in Italy. The Mathematics Genealogy Project suggests that there is a "genealogy" of Nasir al-Dīn al-Ṭūsī → Shams al‐Dīn al‐Bukhārī → Gregory Chioniades → Manuel Bryennios → Theodore Metochites → Gregory Palamas → Nilos Kabasilas → Demetrios Kydones → Gemistos Plethon → Basilios Bessarion → Johannes Regiomontanus → Domenico Maria Novara da Ferrara → Nicolaus (Mikołaj Kopernik) Copernicus. Leonardo da Vinci (1452–1519) wrote "Il sole non si move." ("The Sun does not move.") and he was a student of a student of Bessarion according to the Mathematics Genealogy Project. It has been suggested that the idea of the Tusi couple may have arrived in Europe leaving few manuscript traces, since it could have occurred without the translation of any Arabic text into Latin.

Other scholars have argued that Copernicus could well have developed these ideas independently of the late Islamic tradition. Copernicus explicitly references several astronomers of the "Islamic Golden Age" (10th to 12th centuries) in De Revolutionibus: Albategnius (Al-Battani), Averroes (Ibn Rushd), Thebit (Thabit Ibn Qurra), Arzachel (Al-Zarqali), and Alpetragius (Al-Bitruji), but he does not show awareness of the existence of any of the later astronomers of the Maragha school.

It has been argued that Copernicus could have independently discovered the Tusi couple or took the idea from Proclus's Commentary on the First Book of Euclid, which Copernicus cited. Another possible source for Copernicus' knowledge of this mathematical device is the Questiones de Spera of Nicole Oresme, who described how a reciprocating linear motion of a celestial body could be produced by a combination of circular motions similar to those proposed by al-Tusi.

The state of knowledge on planetary theory received by Copernicus is summarized in Georg von Peuerbach's Theoricae Novae Planetarum (printed in 1472 by Regiomontanus). By 1470, the accuracy of observations by the Vienna school of astronomy, of which Peuerbach and Regiomontanus were members, was high enough to make the eventual development of heliocentrism inevitable, and indeed it is possible that Regiomontanus did arrive at an explicit theory of heliocentrism before his death in 1476, some 30 years before Copernicus.

=== Copernican heliocentrism ===
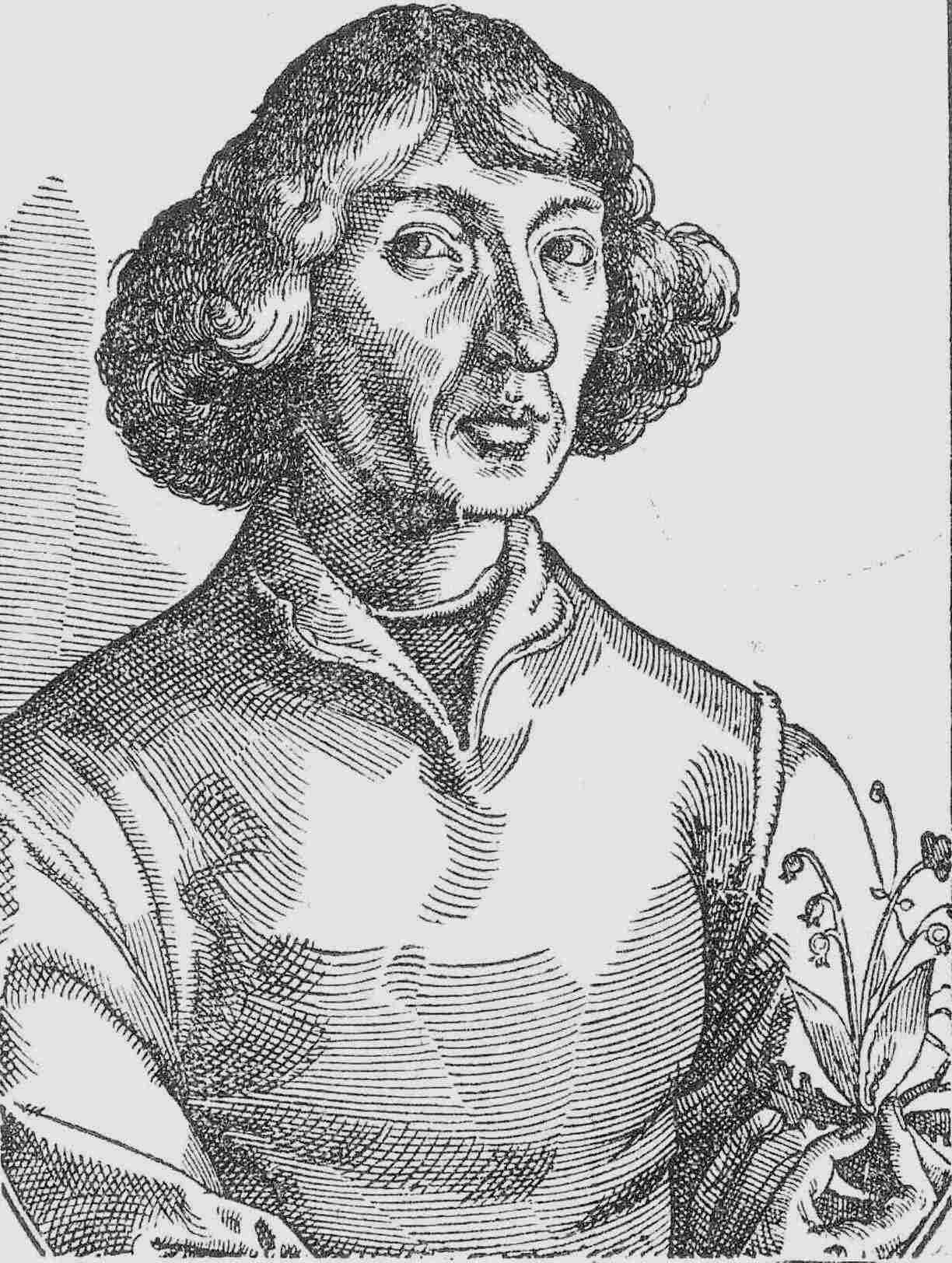
Portrait of Nicolaus Copernicus (1578) (Note: The image shows a woodcut by Christoph Murer, from Nicolaus Reusner's Icones (printed 1578), allegedly after a (lost) self-portrait by Copernicus himself; the Murer portrait became the template for a number of later (17th century) woodcuts, copper engravings and paintings of Copernicus.)

Nicolaus Copernicus (1473–1543) in his De revolutionibus orbium coelestium, 'On the revolution of heavenly spheres', first printed in 1543 in Nuremberg), presented a discussion of a heliocentric model of the universe in much the same way as Ptolemy in the 2nd century had presented his geocentric model in his Almagest. Copernicus discussed the philosophical implications of his proposed system, elaborated it in geometrical detail, used selected astronomical observations to derive the parameters of his model, and wrote astronomical tables which enabled one to compute the past and future positions of the stars and planets. In doing so, Copernicus moved heliocentrism from philosophical speculation to predictive geometrical astronomy. In reality, Copernicus' system did not predict the planets' positions any better than the Ptolemaic system. This theory resolved the issue of planetary retrograde motion by arguing that such motion was only perceived and apparent, rather than real: it was a parallax effect, as an object that one is passing seems to move backwards against the horizon. This issue was also resolved in the geocentric Tychonic system; the latter, however, while eliminating the major epicycles, retained as a physical reality the irregular back-and-forth motion of the planets, which Kepler characterized as a "pretzel".

Copernicus cited Aristarchus in an early (unpublished) manuscript of De Revolutionibus (which still survives), stating: "Philolaus believed in the mobility of the earth, and some even say that Aristarchus of Samos was of that opinion." However, in the published version he restricts himself to noting that in works by Cicero he had found an account of the theories of Hicetas and that Plutarch had provided him with an account of the Pythagoreans, Heraclides Ponticus, Philolaus, and Ecphantus. These authors had proposed a moving Earth, which did not, however, revolve around a central Sun.

==== De Revolutionibus (1543) ====
Copernicus published the definitive statement of his system in De Revolutionibus in 1543. He began to write it in 1506 and finished it in 1530, but did not publish it until the year of his death. Although he was in good standing with the Church and had dedicated the book to Pope Paul III, the published form contained an unsigned preface by Osiander defending the system and arguing that it was useful for computation even if its hypotheses were not necessarily true. Possibly because of that preface, the work of Copernicus inspired very little debate on whether it might be heretical during the next 60 years. There was an early suggestion among Dominicans that the teaching of heliocentrism should be banned, but nothing came of it at the time.

=== Early Religious Reaction To Copernicanism ===
The first information about the heliocentric views of Nicolaus Copernicus was circulated in manuscript completed some time before May 1, 1514. In 1533, Johann Albrecht Widmannstetter delivered in Rome a series of lectures outlining Copernicus' theory. The lectures were heard with interest by Pope Clement VII and several Catholic cardinals.

In 1539, Martin Luther said:

"There is talk of a new astrologer who wants to prove that the earth moves and goes around instead of the sky, the sun, the moon, just as if somebody were moving in a carriage or ship might hold that he was sitting still and at rest while the earth and the trees walked and moved. But that is how things are nowadays: when a man wishes to be clever he must … invent something special, and the way he does it must needs be the best! The fool wants to turn the whole art of astronomy upside-down. However, as Holy Scripture tells us, so did Joshua bid the sun to stand still and not the earth."

This was reported in the context of a conversation at the dinner table and not a formal statement of faith. Melanchthon, however, opposed the doctrine over a period of years.

Some years after the publication of De Revolutionibus John Calvin preached a sermon in which he denounced those who "pervert the order of nature" by saying that "the sun does not move and that it is the earth that revolves and that it turns". (Note: On the other hand, Calvin is not responsible for another famous quotation which has often been misattributed to him: "Who will venture to place the authority of Copernicus above that of the Holy Spirit?" It has long been established that this line cannot be found in any of Calvin's works. It has been suggested that the quotation was originally sourced from the works of Lutheran theologian Abraham Calovius.)

== Reception in Early Modern Europe ==
=== Giordano Bruno ===
During Giordano Bruno's lifetime (1548–1600), he is the only known person to defend Copernicus' heliocentrism. In 1584, Bruno published two dialogues (La Cena de le Ceneri and De l'infinito universo et mondi) in which he argued against the planetary spheres (Christoph Rothmann did the same in 1586 as did Tycho Brahe in 1587) and affirmed the Copernican principle.

In particular, to support the Copernican view and oppose the objection according to which the motion of Earth would be perceived by means of the motion of winds, clouds etc., in La Cena de le Ceneri Bruno anticipates some of the arguments of Galileo on the relativity principle. Bruno was condemned by the Roman Inquisition and burned at the stake on the Campo de' Fiori in Rome in 1600. Note that he also uses the example now known as Galileo's ship.

=== Tycho Brahe's geo-heliocentric system (c. 1587) ===
In this depiction of the Tychonic system, the objects on blue orbits (the Moon and the Sun) revolve around Earth. The objects on orange orbits (Mercury, Venus, Mars, Jupiter, and Saturn) revolve around the Sun. Around all is a sphere of fixed stars, located just beyond Saturn.

Prior to the publication of De Revolutionibus, the most widely accepted system had been proposed by Ptolemy, in which Earth was the center of the universe and all celestial bodies orbited it. Tycho Brahe (1546–1601), arguably the most accomplished astronomer of his time, advocated against Copernicus' heliocentric system and for an alternative to the Ptolemaic geocentric system: a geo-heliocentric system now known as the Tychonic system in which the Sun and Moon orbit Earth, Mercury and Venus orbit the Sun inside the Sun's orbit of Earth, and Mars, Jupiter and Saturn orbit the Sun outside the Sun's orbit of Earth.

Tycho appreciated the Copernican system, but objected to the idea of a moving Earth on the basis of astronomy, physics, and religion. The Aristotelian physics of the time (modern Newtonian physics was still a century away) offered no physical explanation for the motion of a massive body like Earth, whereas it could easily explain the motion of heavenly bodies by postulating that they were made of a different sort substance called aether that moved naturally. So Tycho said that the Copernican system "...expertly and completely circumvents all that is superfluous or discordant in the system of Ptolemy. On no point does it offend the principle of mathematics. Yet it ascribes to the Earth, that hulking, lazy body, unfit for motion, a motion as quick as that of the aethereal torches, and a triple motion at that." Likewise, Tycho took issue with the vast distances to the stars that Aristarchus and Copernicus had assumed in order to explain the lack of any visible parallax. Tycho had measured the apparent sizes of stars (now known to be illusory), and used geometry to calculate that in order to both have those apparent sizes and be as far away as heliocentrism required, stars would have to be huge (much larger than the sun; the size of Earth's orbit or larger). Regarding this Tycho wrote, "Deduce these things geometrically if you like, and you will see how many absurdities (not to mention others) accompany this assumption [of the motion of the earth] by inference." He also cited the Copernican system's "opposition to the authority of Sacred Scripture in more than one place" as a reason why one might wish to reject it, and observed that his own geo-heliocentric alternative "offended neither the principles of physics nor Holy Scripture."

The Jesuits astronomers in Rome were at first unreceptive to Tycho's system; the most prominent, Clavius, commented that Tycho was "confusing all of astronomy, because he wants to have Mars lower than the Sun." However, after the advent of the telescope showed problems with some geocentric models (by demonstrating that Venus circles the Sun, for example), the Tychonic system and variations on that system became popular among geocentrists, and the Jesuit astronomer Giovanni Battista Riccioli would continue Tycho's use of physics, stellar astronomy (now with a telescope), and religion to argue against heliocentrism and for Tycho's system well into the seventeenth century.

=== Johannes Kepler ===
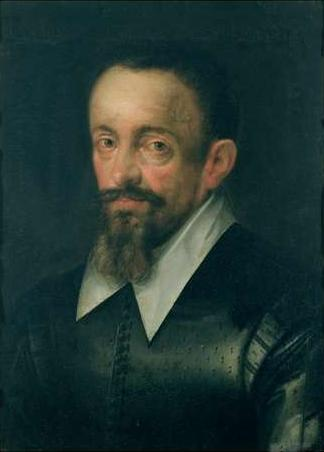
Johannes Kepler was one of the founders and fathers of modern astronomy, the scientific method, natural and modern science.

Using measurements made by Brahe at the observatories on the island of Ven, Johannes Kepler (1571–1630) developed his laws of planetary motion between 1609 and 1619. In Astronomia nova, 'New Astronomy' (1609), Kepler made a diagram of the movement of Mars in relation to Earth if Earth were at the center of its orbit, which shows that Mars' orbit would be completely imperfect and never follow along the same path. To solve the apparent derivation of Mars' orbit from a perfect circle, Kepler derived both a mathematical definition and, independently, a matching ellipse around the Sun to explain the motion of the red planet.

Between 1617 and 1621, Kepler developed a genuinely heliocentric model of the Solar System in Epitome astronomiae Copernicanae, in which all the planets have elliptical orbits, with the Sun close to one focus of the ellipse. This provided significantly increased accuracy in predicting the position of the planets. Kepler's ideas were not immediately accepted, and Galilei for example ignored them. In 1621, Epitome astronomia Copernicanae was placed on the Catholic Church's index of prohibited books. In the period 1630–1650, this book was the most widely used astronomy textbook, because it contained all three laws of the planetary motions and explained them through physical causes, and thus gained many followers for ellipse-based astronomy.

Different local orbital speeds of the ellipse (yellow) and the epicyclic motion (turqoise) by the same observable object from different perspectives

The laws discovered by Kepler represented a significant step in overcoming medieval science and establishing modern astronomy. They are of particular fundamental importance in astronomy. Kepler formulated the laws for the five classical planets that he knew. However, according to the cosmological principle, they are assumed to be valid everywhere in the universe. Kepler's laws apply equally to moons, the asteroid belt and the Oort cloud, or the rings of Jupiter and Saturn, to star clusters as well as to objects orbiting the center of a galaxy, and to all other objects in space. Furthermore, they form the basis of space travel and explain the orbits of satellites.

=== Galileo Galilei and the church ban against Copernicanism in 1616 ===
In 1610 Galileo Galilei observed with his telescope that Venus showed phases, despite remaining near the Sun in Earth's sky (first image). This proved that it orbits the Sun and not Earth, as predicted by Copernicus's heliocentric model, and disproved Ptolemy's geocentric model (second image).

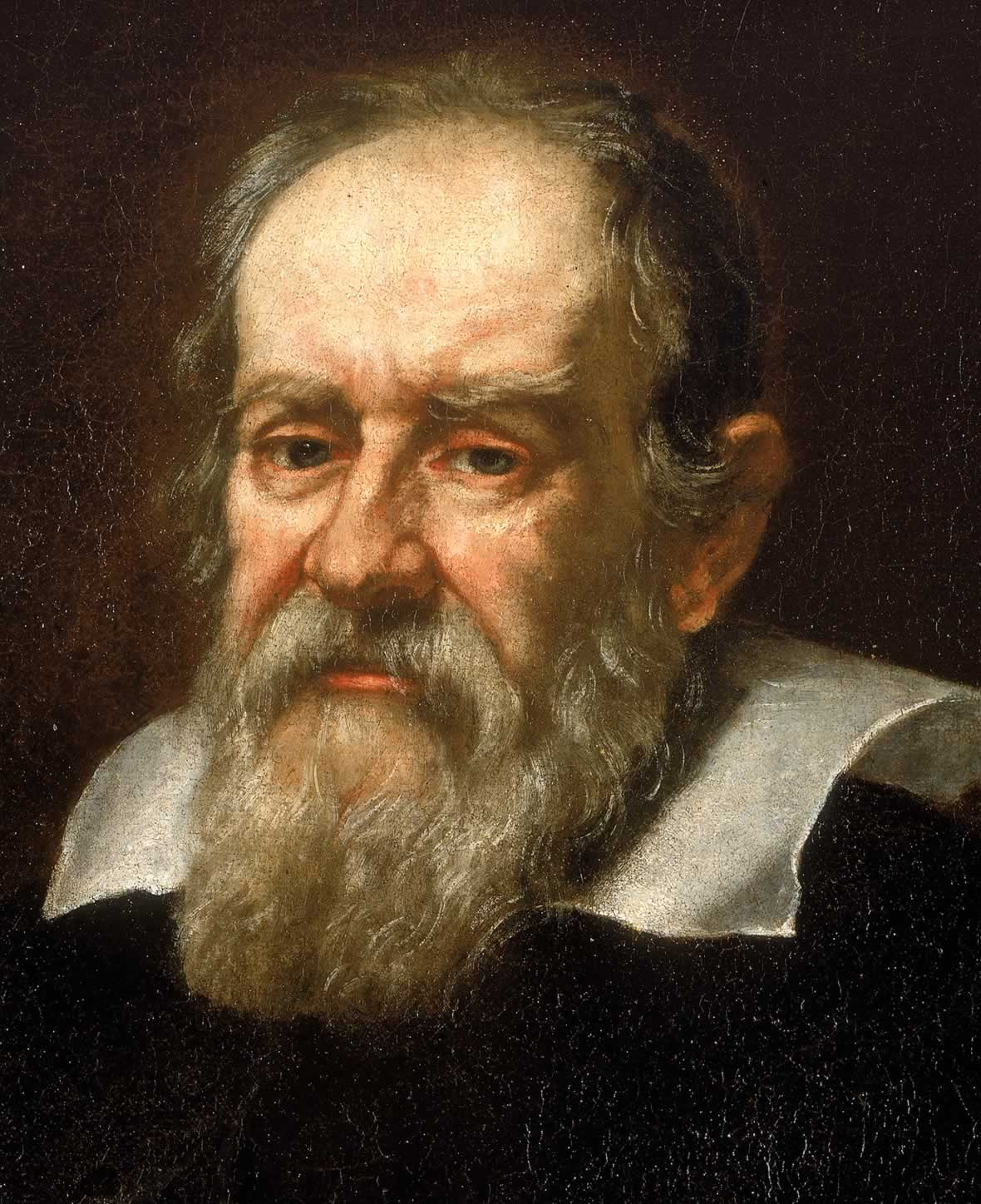
In the 17th century CE, Galileo Galilei opposed the Roman Catholic Church by his strong support for heliocentrism.

Galileo Galilei (1564–1642) was able to look at the night sky with the newly invented telescope. He published his observations that Jupiter is orbited by moons and that the Sun rotates in his Sidereus Nuncius (1610) and Letters on Sunspots (1613), respectively. Around this time, he also announced that Venus exhibits a full range of phases (satisfying an argument that had been made against Copernicus). As the Jesuit astronomers confirmed Galileo's observations, the Jesuits moved away from the Ptolemaic model and toward Tycho's teachings.

In his 1615 "Letter to the Grand Duchess Christina", Galileo defended heliocentrism, and claimed it was not contrary to Holy Scripture. He took Augustine's position on Scripture: not to take every passage literally when the scripture in question is in a Bible book of poetry and songs, not a book of instructions or history. The writers of the Scripture wrote from the perspective of the terrestrial world, and from that vantage point the Sun does rise and set. In fact, it is Earth's rotation which gives the impression of the Sun in motion across the sky. In February 1615, prominent Dominicans including Thomaso Caccini and Niccolò Lorini brought Galileo's writings on heliocentrism to the attention of the Inquisition, because they appeared to violate Holy Scripture and the decrees of the Council of Trent. Cardinal and Inquisitor Robert Bellarmine was called upon to adjudicate, and wrote in April that treating heliocentrism as a real phenomenon would be "a very dangerous thing," irritating philosophers and theologians, and harming "the Holy Faith by rendering Holy Scripture as false."

In January 1616, Msgr. Francesco Ingoli addressed an essay to Galileo disputing the Copernican system. Galileo later stated that he believed this essay to have been instrumental in the ban against Copernicanism that followed in February. According to Maurice Finocchiaro, Ingoli had probably been commissioned by the Inquisition to write an expert opinion on the controversy, and the essay provided the "chief direct basis" for the ban. The essay focused on eighteen physical and mathematical arguments against heliocentrism. It borrowed primarily from the arguments of Tycho Brahe, and it notedly mentioned the problem that heliocentrism requires the stars to be much larger than the Sun. Ingoli wrote that the great distance to the stars in the heliocentric theory "clearly proves ... the fixed stars to be of such size, as they may surpass or equal the size of the orbit circle of the Earth itself." Ingoli included four theological arguments in the essay, but suggested to Galileo that he focus on the physical and mathematical arguments. Galileo did not write a response to Ingoli until 1624.

In February 1616, the Inquisition assembled a committee of theologians, known as qualifiers, who delivered their unanimous report condemning heliocentrism as "foolish and absurd in philosophy, and formally heretical since it explicitly contradicts in many places the sense of Holy Scripture." The Inquisition also determined that Earth's motion "receives the same judgement in philosophy and ... in regard to theological truth it is at least erroneous in faith." Bellarmine personally ordered Galileo

...to abstain completely from teaching or defending this doctrine and opinion or from discussing it... to abandon completely... the opinion that the sun stands still at the center of the world and the earth moves, and henceforth not to hold, teach, or defend it in any way whatever, either orally or in writing.

— Bellarmine and the Inquisition's injunction against Galileo, 1616.

In March 1616, after the Inquisition's injunction against Galileo, the papal Master of the Sacred Palace, Congregation of the Index, and the Pope banned all books and letters advocating the Copernican system, which they called "the false Pythagorean doctrine, altogether contrary to Holy Scripture." In 1618, the Holy Office recommended that a modified version of Copernicus' De Revolutionibus be allowed for use in calendric calculations, though the original publication remained forbidden until 1758.

Pope Urban VIII encouraged Galileo to publish the pros and cons of heliocentrism. Galileo's response, Dialogue concerning the two chief world systems (1632), clearly advocated heliocentrism, despite his declaration in the preface that,

I will endeavour to show that all experiments that can be made upon the Earth are insufficient means to conclude for its mobility but are indifferently applicable to the Earth, movable or immovable...

and his straightforward statement,

I might very rationally put it in dispute, whether there be any such centre in nature, or no; being that neither you nor any one else hath ever proved, whether the World be finite and figurate, or else infinite and interminate; yet nevertheless granting you, for the present, that it is finite, and of a terminate Spherical Figure, and that thereupon it hath its centre...

Some ecclesiastics also interpreted the book as characterizing the Pope as a simpleton, since his viewpoint in the dialogue was advocated by the character Simplicio. Urban VIII became hostile to Galileo and he was again summoned to Rome. Galileo's trial in 1633 involved making fine distinctions between "teaching" and "holding and defending as true". For advancing heliocentric theory Galileo was forced to recant Copernicanism and was put under house arrest for the last few years of his life. According to J. L. Heilbron, informed contemporaries of Galileo's "appreciated that the reference to heresy in connection with Galileo or Copernicus had no general or theological significance."

In 1664, Pope Alexander VII published his Index Librorum Prohibitorum Alexandri VII Pontificis Maximi jussu editus (Index of Prohibited Books, published by order of Alexander VII, P.M.) which included all previous condemnations of heliocentric books.

=== Age of Reason ===
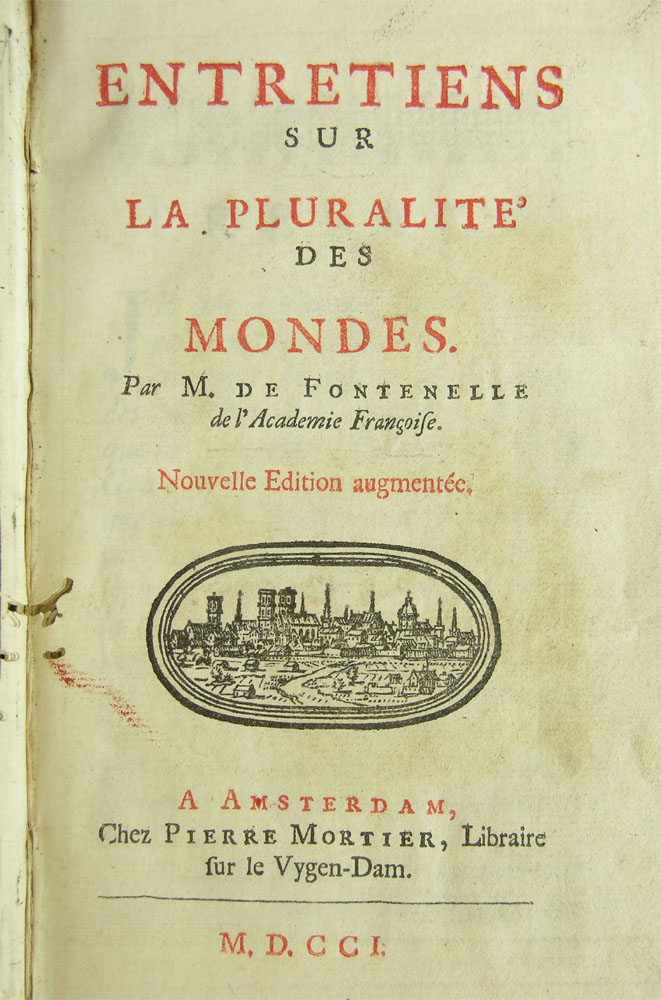
Front page of the book Conversations on the Plurality of Worlds (1701 edition)

René Descartes' first cosmological treatise, written between 1629 and 1633 and titled The World, included a heliocentric model, but Descartes abandoned it in the light of Galileo's treatment. In his Principles of Philosophy (1644), Descartes introduced a mechanical model in which planets do not move relative to their immediate atmosphere, but are constituted around space-matter vortices in curved space; these rotate due to centrifugal force and the resulting centripetal pressure. The Galileo affair did little overall to slow the spread of heliocentrism across Europe, as Kepler's Epitome of Copernican Astronomy became increasingly influential in the coming decades. By 1686, the model was well enough established that the general public was reading about it in Conversations on the Plurality of Worlds, published in France by Bernard le Bovier de Fontenelle and translated into English and other languages in the coming years. It has been called "one of the first great popularizations of science."

In 1687, Isaac Newton published Philosophiæ Naturalis Principia Mathematica, which provided an explanation for Kepler's laws in terms of universal gravitation and what came to be known as Newton's laws of motion. This placed heliocentrism on a firm theoretical foundation, although Newton's heliocentrism was of a somewhat modern kind. Already in the mid-1680s he recognized the "deviation of the Sun" from the center of gravity of the Solar System. For Newton it was not precisely the center of the Sun or any other body that could be considered at rest, but "the common centre of gravity of the Earth, the Sun and all the Planets is to be esteem'd the Centre of the World", and this center of gravity "either is at rest or moves uniformly forward in a right line". Newton adopted the "at rest" alternative in view of common consent that the center, wherever it was, was at rest.

Meanwhile, the Catholic Church remained opposed to heliocentrism as a literal description, but this did not by any means imply opposition to all astronomy; indeed, it needed observational data to maintain its calendar. In support of this effort it allowed the cathedrals themselves to be used as solar observatories called meridiane; i.e., they were turned into "reverse sundials", or gigantic pinhole cameras, where the Sun's image was projected from a hole in a window in the cathedral's lantern onto a meridian line.

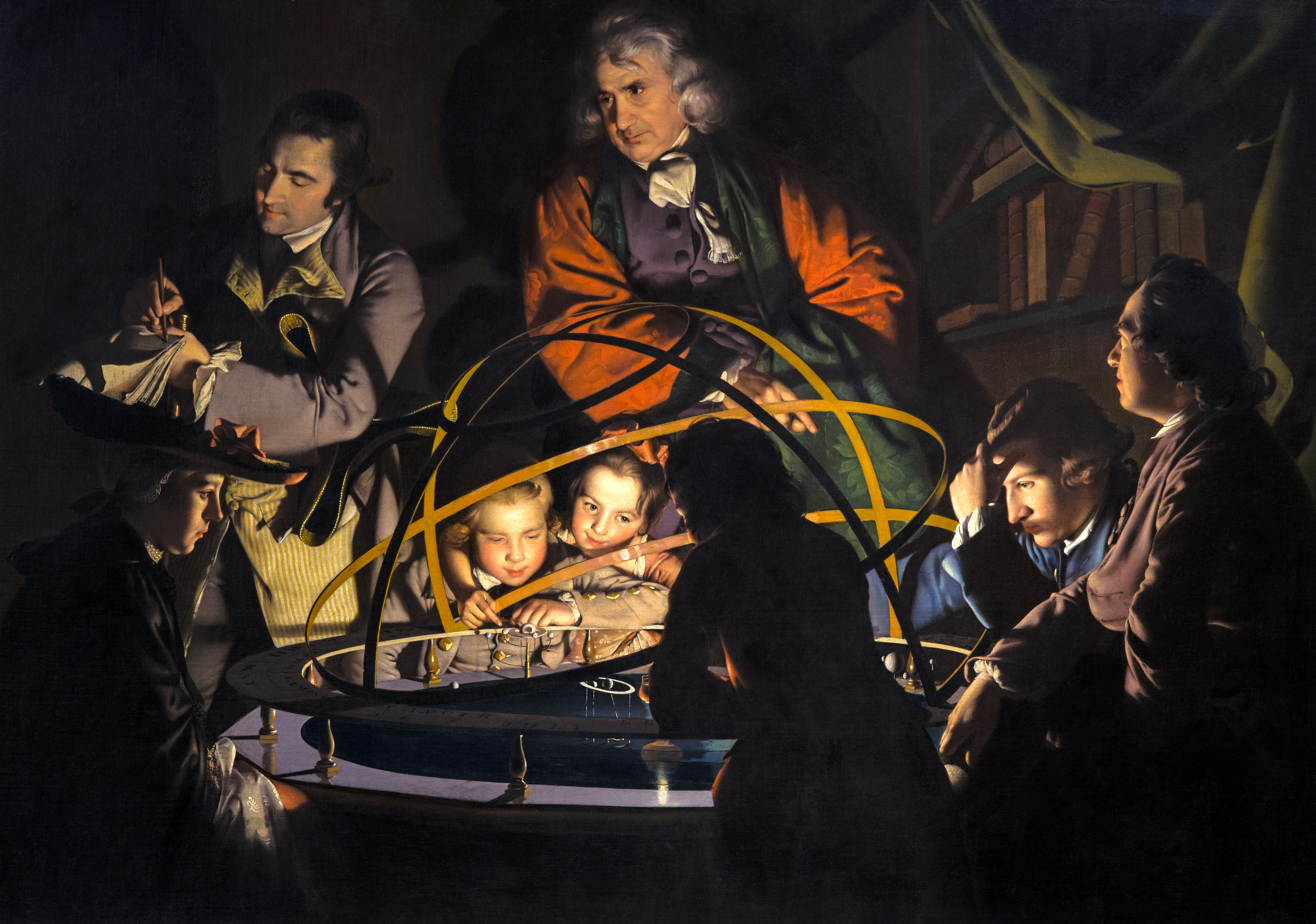
A Philosopher Lecturing on the Orrery (1766) by Joseph Wright, in which a lamp represents the Sun

In the mid-18th century the Church's opposition began to fade. An annotated copy of Newton's Principia was published in 1742 by Fathers le Seur and Jacquier of the Franciscan Minims, two Catholic mathematicians, with a preface stating that the author's work assumed heliocentrism and could not be explained without the theory. In 1758 the Catholic Church dropped the general prohibition of books advocating heliocentrism from the Index of Forbidden Books. The Observatory of the Roman College was established by Pope Clement XIV in 1774 (nationalized in 1878, but re-founded by Pope Leo XIII as the Vatican Observatory in 1891). In spite of dropping its active resistance to heliocentrism, the Catholic Church did not lift the prohibition of uncensored versions of Copernicus' De Revolutionibus or Galileo's Dialogue. The affair was revived in 1820, when the Master of the Sacred Palace (the Catholic Church's chief censor), Filippo Anfossi, refused to license a book by a Catholic canon, Giuseppe Settele, because it openly treated heliocentrism as a physical fact. Settele appealed to pope Pius VII. After the matter had been reconsidered by the Congregation of the Index and the Holy Office, Anfossi's decision was overturned. Pius VII approved a decree in 1822 by the Sacred Congregation of the Inquisition to allow the printing of heliocentric books in Rome. Copernicus' De Revolutionibus and Galileo's Dialogue were then subsequently omitted from the next edition of the Index when it appeared in 1835.

Three apparent proofs of the heliocentric hypothesis were provided in 1727 by James Bradley, in 1838 by Friedrich Wilhelm Bessel, and in 1851 by Léon Foucault. Bradley discovered the stellar aberration, proving the relative motion of Earth. Bessel proved that the parallax of a star was greater than zero by measuring the parallax of 0.314 arcseconds of a star named 61 Cygni. In the same year Friedrich Georg Wilhelm Struve and Thomas Henderson measured the parallaxes of other stars, Vega and Alpha Centauri. Experiments like those of Foucault were performed by V. Viviani in 1661 in Florence and by Bartolini in 1833 in Rimini.

=== Reception in Judaism ===
Already in the Talmud, Greek philosophy and science under the general name "Greek wisdom" were considered dangerous. They were put under ban then and later for some periods. The first Jewish scholar to describe the Copernican system, albeit without mentioning Copernicus by name, was Maharal of Prague, in his book "Be'er ha-Golah" (1593). Maharal makes an argument of radical skepticism, arguing that no scientific theory can be reliable, which he illustrates by the new-fangled theory of heliocentrism upsetting even the most fundamental views on the cosmos.

Copernicus is mentioned in the books of David Gans (1541–1613), who worked with Brahe and Kepler. Gans wrote two books on astronomy in Hebrew: a short one, "Magen David" (1612), and a full one, "Nehmad veNaim" (published only in 1743). He described objectively three systems: those of Ptolemy, Copernicus, and Brahe, without taking sides. Joseph Solomon Delmedigo (1591–1655) in his "Elim" (1629) says that the arguments of Copernicus are so strong, that only an imbecile will not accept them. Delmedigo studied at Padua and was Galileo's student.

An actual controversy on the Copernican model within Judaism arises only in the early 18th century. Most authors in this period had accepted Copernican heliocentrism, with opposition from David Nieto and Tobias Cohn, who argued against heliocentrism on the grounds it contradicted scripture. Nieto merely rejected the new system on those grounds without much passion, whereas Cohn went so far as to call Copernicus "a first-born of Satan", though he also acknowledged that he would have found it difficult to proffer one particular objection based on a passage from the Talmud.

In the 19th century, two students of the Chasam Sofer wrote books that were given approbations by him even though one supported heliocentrism and the other geocentrism. One, a commentary on Genesis titled Yafe'ah le-Ketz written by R. Israel David Schlesinger resisted a heliocentric model and supported geocentrism. The other, Mei Menuchot written by R. Eliezer Lipmann Neusatz encouraged acceptance of the heliocentric model and other modern scientific thinking.

Since the 20th century most Jews have not questioned the science of heliocentrism. Exceptions include Shlomo Benizri and R. M.M. Schneerson of Chabad who argued that the question of heliocentrism vs. geocentrism is obsolete because of the relativity of motion. Many of Schneerson's followers in Chabad continue to deny the heliocentric model.

== Modern science ==
=== William Herschel's heliocentrism ===
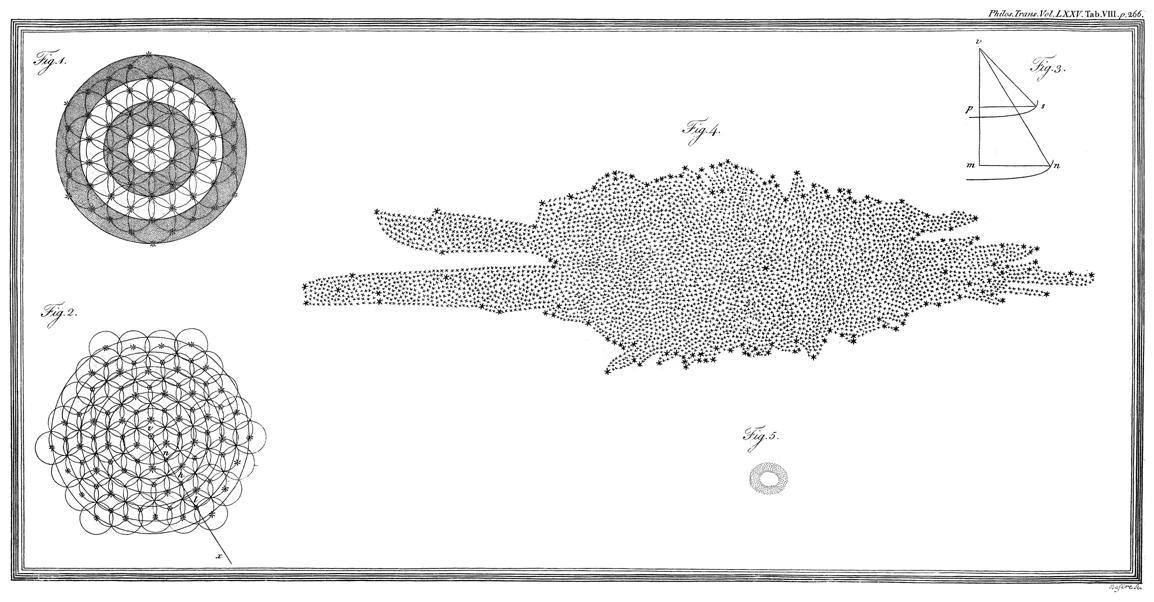
William Herschel's model of the Milky Way, 1785

In 1783, amateur astronomer William Herschel attempted to determine the shape of the universe by examining stars through his handmade telescopes. Herschel was the first to propose a model of the universe based on observation and measurement. At that time, the dominant assumption in cosmology was that the Milky Way was the entire universe, an assumption that has since been proven wrong with observations. Herschel concluded that it was in the shape of a disk, but assumed that the Sun was in the center of the disk, making the model heliocentric.

Seeing that the stars belonging to the Milky Way appeared to encircle Earth, Herschel carefully counted stars of given apparent magnitudes, and after finding the numbers were the same in all directions, concluded Earth must be close to the center of the Milky Way. However, there were two flaws in Herschel's methodology: magnitude is not a reliable index to the distance of stars, and some of the areas that he mistook for empty space were actually dark, obscuring nebulae that blocked his view toward the center of the Milky Way.

The Herschel model remained relatively unchallenged for the next hundred years, with minor refinements. Jacobus Kapteyn introduced motion, density, and luminosity to Herschel's star counts, which still implied a near-central location of the Sun.

=== Replacement with galactocentrism and acentrism ===
Already in the early 19th century, Thomas Wright and Immanuel Kant speculated that fuzzy patches of light called nebulae were actually distant "island universes" consisting of many stellar systems. The shape of the Milky Way galaxy was expected to resemble such "islands universes".

However, "scientific arguments were marshalled against such a possibility", and this view was rejected by almost all scientists until the early 20th century, with Harlow Shapley's work on globular clusters and Edwin Hubble's measurements in 1924. After Shapley and Hubble showed that the Sun is not the center of the universe, cosmology moved on from heliocentrism to galactocentrism, which states that the Milky Way is the center of the universe.

Hubble's observations of redshift in light from distant galaxies indicated that the universe was expanding and acentric. As a result, soon after galactocentrism was formulated, it was abandoned in favor of the Big Bang model of the acentric expanding universe. Further assumptions, such as the Copernican principle, the cosmological principle, dark energy, and dark matter, eventually lead to the current model of cosmology, Lambda-CDM.

=== Special relativity and the "center" ===
The concept of an absolute velocity, including being "at rest" as a particular case, is ruled out by the principle of relativity, also eliminating any obvious "center" of the universe as a natural origin of coordinates. Even if the discussion is limited to the Solar System, the Sun is not at the geometric center of any planet's orbit, but rather approximately at one focus of the elliptical orbit. Furthermore, to the extent that a planet's mass cannot be neglected in comparison to the Sun's mass, the center of gravity of the Solar System is displaced slightly away from the center of the Sun. (The masses of the planets, mostly Jupiter, amount to 0.14% of that of the Sun.) Therefore, a hypothetical astronomer on an extrasolar planet would observe a small "wobble" in the Sun's motion.

=== Modern use of geocentric and heliocentric ===
In modern calculations, the terms "geocentric" and "heliocentric" are often used to refer to reference frames. In such systems the origin in the center of mass of Earth, of the Earth–Moon system, of the Sun, of the Sun plus the major planets, or of the entire Solar System, can be selected. Right ascension and declination are examples of geocentric coordinates, used in Earth-based observations, while the heliocentric latitude and longitude are used for orbital calculations. This leads to such terms as "heliocentric velocity" and "heliocentric angular momentum". In this heliocentric picture, any planet of the Solar System can be used as a source of mechanical energy because it moves relatively to the Sun. A smaller body (either artificial or natural) may gain heliocentric velocity due to gravity assist – this effect can change the body's mechanical energy in heliocentric reference frame (although it will not changed in the planetary one). However, such selection of "geocentric" or "heliocentric" frames is merely a matter of computation. It does not have philosophical implications and does not constitute a distinct physical or scientific model. From the point of view of general relativity, inertial reference frames do not exist at all, and any practical reference frame is only an approximation to the actual space-time, which can have higher or lower precision. Some forms of Mach's principle consider the frame at rest with respect to the distant masses in the universe to have special properties.

== See also ==
- Copernican principle
- Copernican Revolution (metaphor)
