= Al-Qurtubi (surname) =

The Arabic nisbah (attributive title) Al-Qurtubi (Arabic: القرطبي) denotes an origin from Córdoba, Spain.

- Abu 'Abdullah Al-Qurtubi was a famous mufassir, muhaddith and maliki faqih scholar from Cordoba.

Al-Qurtubi may also refer to:

- Ibn Abi al-Shukr: 13th-cetnruy astronomer, astrologer and mathematician of the Islamic Golden Age.
- Ibn Hayyan: 11th-century Muslim historian.
- Muhammad al-Idrisi: 12th-century Muslim geographer, cartographer, Egyptologist and traveller who lived in Sicily.
