= Zij-i Ilkhani =

Medieval astronomical tables

Zīj-i Īlkhānī (Persian: زیجِ ایلخانی) or Ilkhanic Tables (literal translation: "The Ilkhan Stars", after ilkhan Hulagu, who was the patron of the author at that time) is a Zij book with astronomical tables of planetary movements. It was compiled by the Muslim astronomer Nasir al-Din al-Tusi in collaboration with his research team of astronomers at the Maragha observatory. It was written in Persian and later translated into Arabic.

The book contains tables for calculating the positions of the planets and the names of the stars. It included data derived from the observations made over the course of 12 years in the Maragha observatory, completed in 1272. The planetary positions of the Zij-i Ilkhani, derived from the zijs of Ibn al-A'lam and Ibn Yunus (10/11th cent. AD), were so faulty that later astronomers, such as al-Wabkanawi and Rukn al-Din al-Amuli, criticized it severely.

The Zīj-i Īlkhānī set the precession of the equinoxes at 51 arcseconds per year, which is very close to the modern value of 50.2 arcseconds. The book also describes a method of interpolation between the observed positions, which in modern terms may be described as a second-order interpolation scheme.

== History ==
Hulagu Khan believed that many of his military successes were due to the advice of astronomers (who were also astrologers), especially of al-Tusi. Therefore, when al-Tusi complained that his astronomical tables were 250 years old, Hulagu gave permission to build a new observatory in a place of al-Tusi's choice (he chose Maragheh). A number of other prominent astronomers worked with al-Tusi there, including Muhyi al-Din al-Maghribi, Qutb al-Din al-Shirazi, Mu'ayyid al-Din al-'Urdi from Damascus. Furthermore, the influence of Chinese astronomy was brought by Fao Munji, whose astronomical experience brought improvements to Ptolemaic system used by al-Tusi; traces of the Chinese system may be seen in Zij-i Ilkhani. The tables were published during the reign of Abaqa Khan, Hulagu's son, and named after the patron of the observatory. They were popular until the 15th century.

Some Islamic astronomical tables such as the Zij-i Al-`Ala'i of Abd-Al-Karim al-Fahhad and the Zij al-Sanjari of al-Khazini were translated into Byzantine Greek by Gregory Chioniades and studied in the Byzantine Empire. Chioniades himself had studied under Shams ad-Din al-Bukhari, who had worked at the famous Maragheh observatory after the death of al-Tusi.

== See also ==
- Zij
- Astronomy in medieval Islam
