= Kavisekhara Dr Umar Alisha =

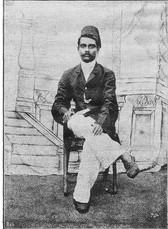
- Umar Alishah in 1911
- Born: February 28, 1885; Pithapuram
- Died: January 23, 1945 (aged 59); Narsapur
- Resting place: Old Ashram of Sri Viswa Viznana Vidya Adhyatmika Peetham; 17°6′25″N 82°15′16″E
- Other name: Umar Aly Sahab
- Known for: Telugu poetry, author of more than 50 books
- Title: Moulvi, Pandit, Doctor Literarum
- Predecessor: Mohiddin Badsha I
- Successor: Hussain Sha
- Spouse: Akbar Bibi
- Children: Hussain Sha, Khader Basha, Silarunnisa, Fathimunnisa, Madeen Kabir Sha, Mohiddin Basha, Talab Alisha
- Parent(s): Mohiddin Badsha I, Chand Bi
- Website: www.sriviswaviznanspiritual.org

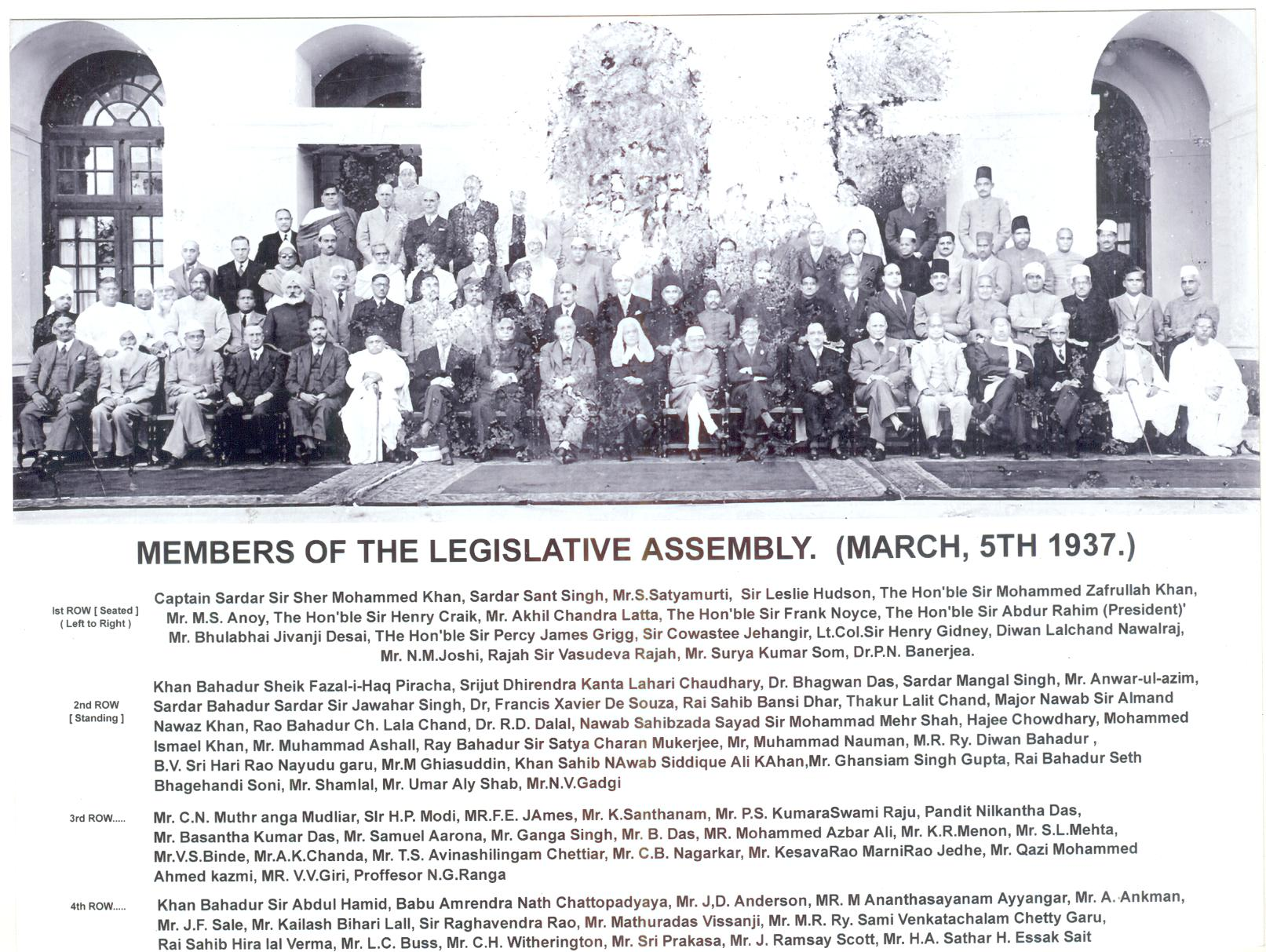
Dr Umar Alisha along with the Members of Legislative Assembly 1937-03-05

Kavisekhara Dr. Umar Alisha (28 February 1885, Pithapuram – 23 January 1945, Narsapur), was the sixth Peethadhipathi of Sri Viswa Viznana Vidya Adhyatmika Peetham in Pithapuram, India. He succeeded his father Mohiddin Badusha I.

== Background ==
Dr. Umar Alisha actively participated in the Khilafat Movement, a unique battle against the British rulers, waged with Gandhi caps in the early 1920s by the students of the Victoria Diamond Jubilee Medical School, which later became the Andhra Medical College. It all started on 19 September 1921 when one of the students came to the classroom sporting the khadi cap. He was incensed like his compatriots of those days over the arrest of the freedom-fighter Maulana Mohammad Ali at the Waltair (now Visakhapatnam) railway station on 1921-09-14.

Mohammed Ali, one of the famed Ali Brothers (the other was Maulana Shaukat Ali) was proceeding to Madras along with Mahatma Gandhi by the Howrah-Madras Mail. Both the leaders alighted at the station packed with a lot of people and policemen. As soon as Mohammed Ali got down from the train, a shivering Superintendent of Police served the arrest warrant on Ali and whisked him away to Central Jail. Gandhi addressed the gathering and continued his journey to Madras.

While in jail, Ali was visited by local Congress leaders, including P.C. Venkatapathi Raju and Vasantarao Butchisundara Rao. Soon a public meeting was held on the beach where loads of foreign clothes were burnt. Umar Alisha, a Telugu poet, made a speech against the arrest of the Khilafat movement leader. On the morning of 17 September 1921, Ali was taken to the Waltair station from jail with a police escort for his departure to Karachi.

== Positions held ==
- Peethadhipathi – Sri Viswa Viznana Vidya Adhyatmika Peetham – 1928–1995
- Member – Indian National Congress: 1916–1930
- National Secretary – Khilafat Movement – 1924
- Vice-President, Secretary – Muslim League, Madras Branch
- Member of the National Legislative Assembly (Parliament) – North Madras constituency: 1936–1945
- Member – Education Committee – Banaras Hindu University
- Member – Muslim Board of Studies for Telugu – Andhra University – 1933

== Titles awarded ==
He was awarded the following titles:

- “Moulvi” by Aligarh Muslim University.
- "Pandit" by All India oriental conference and declared on this occasion that : First Muslim Telugu Poet in Andhra Pradesh to have learned Sanskrit, Persian, Arabic, English" – 1924
- Awarded and honored by the Arya University of France.
- "Doctor Literarum" (Doctor of Literature) by International Academy of America – 1936

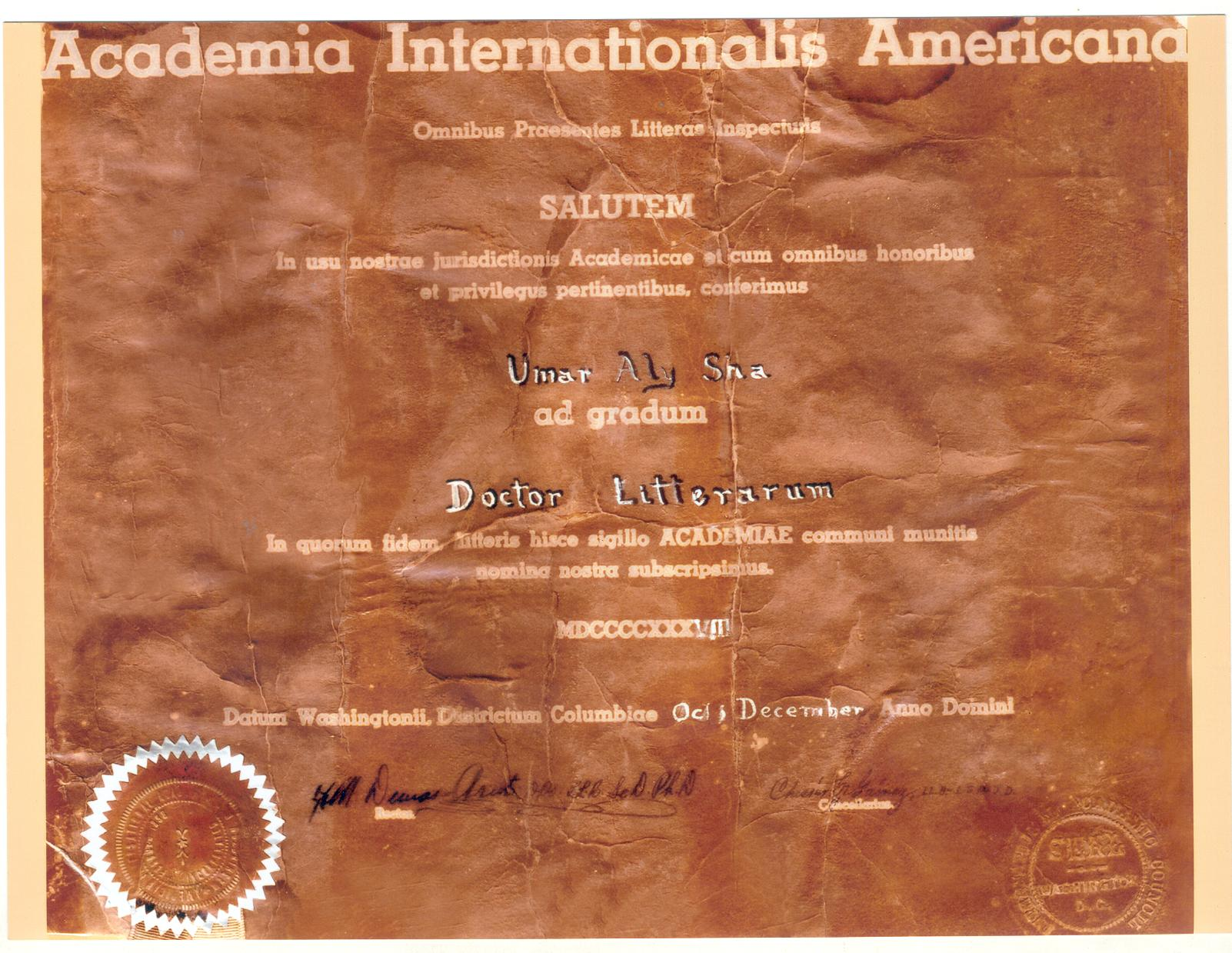
Doctor of Literature Awarded by International Academy of America – 1936

== Works ==
He wrote over 50 books in Telugu reflecting his ideas relating to patriotism, women's education, women's freedom, the dowry system, spiritual philosophy etc.

- Danava Vadha (Telugu)
- Maha Bharatha Kourava Rangamu (Telugu)
- Sufi Vedanta Darsamu (Telugu)
- Anasuya Devi (Telugu)
- Kala (Drama) (Telugu)
- Prabhata Kathavali (Telugu)
- Vishada Soundaryamu (Telugu)
- Vichitra Bhilvaneeyamu (Telugu)
- Brahma Vidya Vilasamu (Telugu)
- Omar Khayyam (Telugu)
- Parathatva Keerthanalu (Telugu)
- Tatva Sandesham (Telugu)
- Chandra Gupta (Drama) (Telugu)
- Mani Mala (Telugu)
- Shantha (Telugu) Available Online
- Khanda Kavyamulu (Telugu) Available Online
- Barhini Devi (Telugu)
- Sadhana Padhamu (Telugu)
- Padmavathi (Telugu)
- Sri Mohammad Rasul Vari Charitra (Telugu)
- Chandragupta (Telugu) Available Online

== Death ==
He died on 23 January 1945 at Narsapur. The Umar Alisha Sahithi Samithi foundation established in his name conducts yearly literary gatherings at Bhimavaram.
