= Brahmarishi Hussain Sha =

Indian writer (1905–1981)

- Born: September 9, 1905; Rajahmundry
- Died: September 24, 1981 (aged 76); Pithapuram
- Resting place: Old Ashram of Sri Viswa Viznana Vidya Adhyatmika Peetham; 17°6′25″N 82°15′16″E
- Education: Primary Education, Pithapuram, F.A(Final Arts from National College, Machilipatnam,
- Known for: Telugu poetry
- Title: Brahmarishi
- Predecessor: Kavisekhara Dr Umar Alisha
- Successor: Mohiddin Badsha II
- Spouse: Ajeemunnisa Begum
- Parent(s): Kavisekhara Dr Umar Alisha, Akbar Bibi
- Website: www.sriviswaviznanspiritual.org

Hussain Sha (September 9, 1905 – September 24, 1981) was the seventh head of Sri Viswa Viznana Vidya Adhyatmika Peetham in Pithapuram. He was born in Rajahmundry, East Godavari District. He succeeded his father, Kavisekhara Dr Umar Alisha Sathguru. He completed his primary education at Pithapuram and passed the Final Arts course from National College in Machilipatnam. He was a scholar in Telugu, Arabic, Urdu, Persian and Sanskrit.

Sha and his wife Ajeemunnisa Begum had four sons and four daughters. Before taking on the role of Peethadhipathi (Head of the Institution), his primary occupation was farming. Leveraging that experience, he created a celestial herbal medicine called Devadaru.

Hussain Sha had taken up preaching of the Peetham's philosophy from February 10, 1945. He delivered Divine spiritual messages at many villages and cities of Andhra Pradesh to propagate Jnanayoga (Yoga of Supreme Knowledge) and Bhaktiyoga (Yoga of Devotion). He died in Pithapuram, East Godavari District, Andhra Pradesh, India.

Hussain Sha is also known for his philosophy. In SHA TATWAM, he has explained many things about the Miraculous Brilliant Divine Light and how the man should behave.
