= Mohiuddin Ahmed (disambiguation) =

Mohiuddin Ahmed may refer to:

== Given name ==
- Mohiuddin Ahmad, Bangladeshi film director
- Mohiuddin Ahmad (author) (born 1952), Bangladeshi author
- Mohiuddin Ahmed (died 2010), Bangladeshi Army officer convicted and executed for the assassination of Sheikh Mujibur Rahman
- Mohiuddin Ahmed (ambassador) (1936–2025), former ambassador to Senegal and Nepal
- Mohiuddin Ahmed (Barisal politician) (1934–2002), Bangladeshi MP
- Mohiuddin Ahmed (foreign secretary) (1942–2022), former foreign secretary
- Mohiuddin Ahmed (Munshiganj politician) (1941–2026), Bangladeshi MP
- Mohiuddin Ahmed (Pabna politician), Bangladeshi MP
- Mohiuddin Ahmed (politician, born 1925) (1925–1997), Bangladeshi MP
- Mohiuddin Ahmed (publisher) (1941–2021), Bangladeshi publisher and University Press Limited founder
- A. K. M. Mohiuddin Ahmed (1949–2010), Bangladeshi Army officer convicted and executed for the assassination of Sheikh Mujibur Rahman
- Md Mohiuddin Ahmed, Bangladeshi engineer

== See also ==
- A. B. M. Mohiuddin Chowdhury (1944–2017), Pakistani politician
- Ahmed Mohiuddin (1923–1998), Pakistani scientist, scholar
- Ahmed Mohiuddin (politician) (1898–?), Indian politician
