= Gregory Chioniades =

Byzantine Greek astronomer

Gregory Chioniades (Greek: Γρηγόριος Χιονιάδης, romanized: Grēgorios Chioniadēs; c. 1240 – c. 1320) was a Byzantine astronomer. He traveled to Persia, where he learned Persian mathematical and astronomical science, which he introduced into Byzantium upon his return from Persia and founded an astronomical academy at Trebizond. Chioniades also served as Orthodox bishop in Tabriz.

== Biography ==
Information about Chioniades survives from some contemporary sources. In 1347, George Chrysokokkes wrote that

a certain Chioniades, who had been raised in Constantinople, fell in love with mathematics and other sciences. After he had mastered medicine, he wished to study astronomy; he was informed that in order to satisfy his desire, he would have to go to Persia (then under Ilkhanate rule). He traveled to Trebizond, where he was given some assistance by the Emperor Alexios II of Trebizond, and thence proceeded to Persia itself, where he persuaded yet another Emperor to aid him. He eventually learned all that he wished to know, and returned to Trebizond, bearing away from Persia a number of astronomical texts which he translated into Greek.

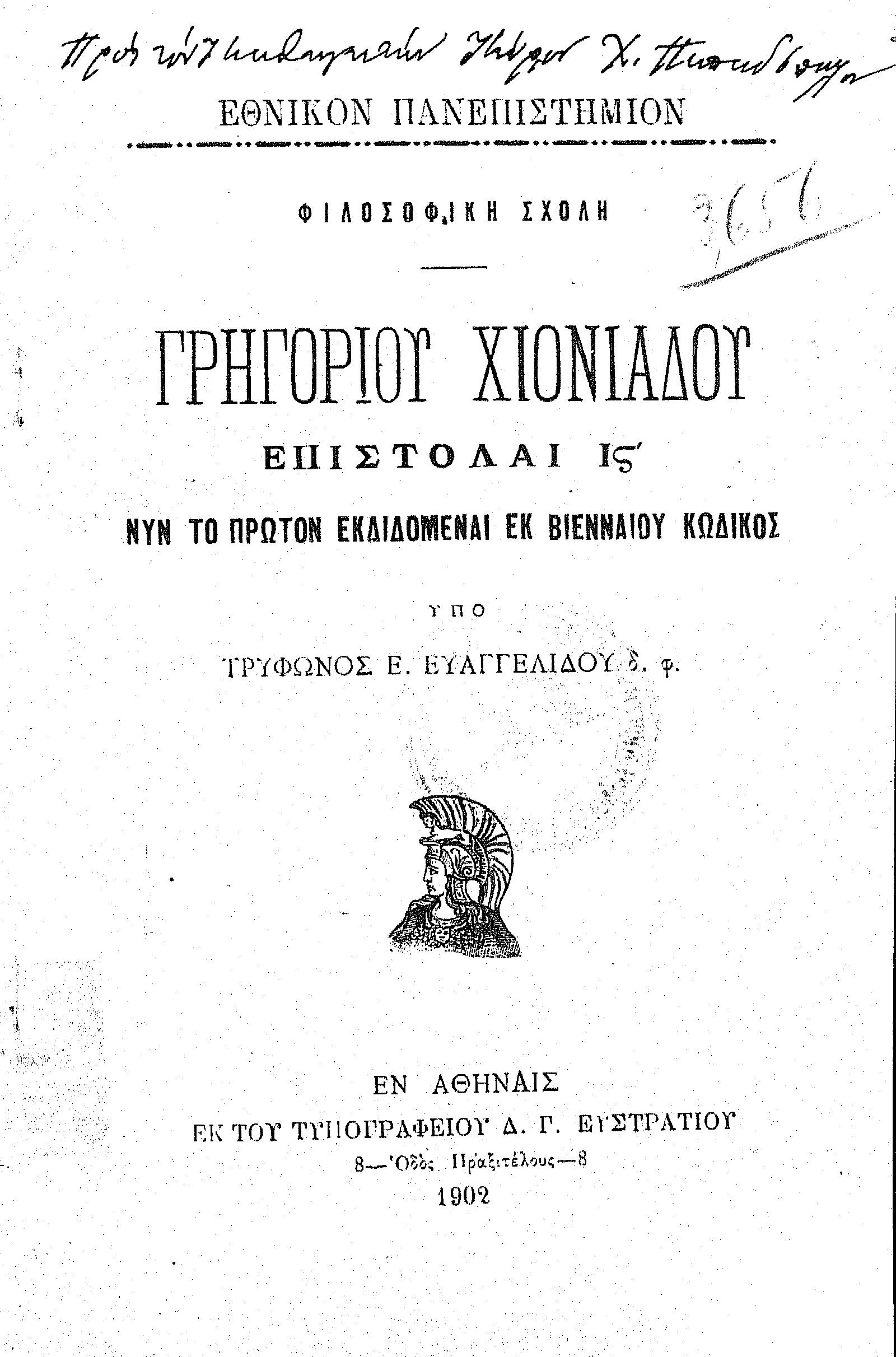
Epistolae of Gregory Chioniades, Athens 1902 edition by Trifon E. Evaggelides

He was born in Constantinople, probably around 1240, and was originally named George. Sixteen of Chioniades' letters have survived, which confirm that he received assistance from Alexios II and traveled to Persia. Chioniades translated a number of Arabic and Persian works on mathematics and astronomy, including the astronomical tables of his teacher Shams al-Din al-Bukhari, who had worked at the famous Maragheh observatory under the polymath Nasir al-Din al-Tusi. Chioniades played an important role in transmitting several innovations from the Islamic world to Europe. These include the introduction of the universal latitude-independent astrolabe to Europe and a Greek description of the Tusi couple, which would later have an influence on Copernican heliocentrism. Chioniades also translated several Zij treatises into Greek, including the Persian Zij-i Ilkhani by al-Tusi and the Maragheh observatory as well as the Seljuk Sanjaric Tables by al-Khazini, an Islamic astronomer of Byzantine Greek descent.

Chioniades resided in Tabriz, at the time the Mongol capital, from 1295 to 1296, serving as the Orthodox bishop to the Orthodox community in that city, and later returned to Constantinople. In 1302 he returned to Tabriz as bishop. According to David Pingree, this may have been in connection with Andronikos II Palaiologos's attempt to form an alliance with Ghazan Khan in the summer of 1302.

He stayed at Tabriz at least until 1310, before returning to Trebizond, where he is attested as a hieromonk around 1315. Chioniades also wrote religious works, including a commentary on John of Damascus, a liturgy akolouthia on St. Eugenios of Trebizond, and a profession of faith.

== Sources ==
- Fryde, Edmund Boleslaw "The Early Palaeologan Renaissance 1261 - C. 1360" 2000
- Haramundanis, Katherine (2007). "Chioniades, Gregor [George]". In Thomas Hockey; et al. (eds.). The Biographical Encyclopedia of Astronomers. New York: Springer. p. 229. ISBN 978-0-387-31022-0.
- Leichter, Joseph Gerard (2004). The Zīj as-Sanjarī of Gregory Chioniades: Text, Translation and Greek to Arabic Glossary (PhD thesis). Providence, Rhode Island.
- Pingree, David (1964). "Gregory Chioniades and Palaeologan Astronomy". Dumbarton Oaks Papers. 18: 133–160. doi:10.2307/1291210. JSTOR 1291210.
- Trapp, Erich; Beyer, Hans-Veit; Walther, Rainer; Sturm-Schnabl, Katja; Kislinger, Ewald; Leontiadis, Ioannis; Kaplaneres, Sokrates (1976–1996). Prosopographisches Lexikon der Palaiologenzeit (in German). Vienna: Verlag der Österreichischen Akademie der Wissenschaften. ISBN 3-7001-3003-1.
- Westerink, L. G. (1980). "La profession de foi de Grégoire Chioniadès". Revue des études byzantines (in French). 38: 233–245. doi:10.3406/rebyz.1980.2109.
- Zehiroğlu, Ahmet M. (2016). "Astronomy in the Trebizond Empire". Translated by Paula Darwish.
