= Mohiddin Badsha II =

Indian scholar

Brahmarishi Mohiddin Badsha II
- Born: July 11, 1933; Pithapuram
- Died: July 31, 1989 (aged 56); Pithapuram
- Resting place: Sri Viswa Viznana Vidya Adhyatmika Peetham (Ashram); 17°6′25″N 82°15′16″E
- Education: High School, Pithapuram, Intermediate: P.R Government College, Kakinada, B.A from The Hindu College, Machilipatnam,
- Known for: Good Orator, Telugu Poetry
- Title: Brahmarishi
- Predecessor: Brahmarishi Hussain Sha
- Successor: Umar Alisha
- Spouse: Jaharunnisa Begum
- Children: six sons and three daughters
- Parent(s): Hussain Sha, Ajeemunnisa Begum
- Website: www.sriviswaviznanspiritual.org

Sri Mohiddin Badsha II (July 11, 1933 at Pithapuram – July 31, 1989 in Pithapuram), was a scholar in Telugu, Arabic, Urdu, Sanskrit, Parsee and English. Son of Sri Brahmarishi Hussain Sha and Ajeemunnisa Begum. He married Fatima Jaharunnisa Begum on May 19, 1963. He had six sons and three daughters. He took over the Lordship of Peetham as 8th Head on September 25, 1981. Due to the old age and ill health of his father Brahmarishi Hussain Sha Sathguru and as a future Head of the Institution, he had undertaken the preceptive of the Peetham's philosophy from 1969.He delivered speeches at many villages of Andhra Pradesh to promote Jnana yoga.

He was the editor-in-chief “Adhyatmika Thatva Prabodham” a spiritual monthly magazine which is now named as “Tatwa Znanamu”.

He delivered a reverberating and enchanting speech on April 12, 1975 at Hyderabad during World Telugu Conference and kept the entire audience spell bound

His feretory is at the old ashram at Pithapuram.

== Author of ==
1) Tatwa Prabhodam (Telugu)The Upanishad, the Divine inner voice has manifested as the speeches of Sri Mohiddin Badsha Sathguru during the process of Bhava Parinama the perceptual evolution into the Cosmic Form are compiled in Tatwa Prabhodam. This compilation collects the flow of nectar of reverberating speeches of by Sri Mohiddin Badsha Sathguru addressed to the members of this Institution at Thursday Congregations and other auspicious occasions.

2) Precept Of Philosophy Part 1 (English)

3) Precept Of Philosophy Part 2 (English)

These are the English Translations of Tatwa Prabodham (Telugu)
