= Muhiddin =

Muhiddin is a masculine given name and surname of Arabic origin. In Turkish, the name is spelled as Muhittin. It is a variant of Muḥyī'd-Dīn. Notable people with the name include:

== Given name ==
- Muhi al-Din Muhammad Aurangzeb (1618–1707), Emperor of the Sultanate of India and the Mughal Empire
- Muhi Al-Din Lari (died 1526), Indian or Persian miniaturist and writer
- Muhyeddin Seghatoleslam (born 1960), Persian architect and urban designer
- Muhyi al-Din Faris (1936–2008), Sudanese poet
- Muhyi ad-Din Muzaffar Jang Hidayat (died 1751), ruler of Hyderabad
- Muhyi al-Dīn al-Maghribī (1220–1283), Spanish-born Arab astronomer
- Muhidin (born 1958), Indonesian politician
- Muhidin Čoralić (born 1968), Bosnian footballer
- Muhidin Mohamad Said (born 1950), Indonesian businessman and politician
- Muhidin Teskeredžić (born 1958), Bosnian footballer
- Muhidin Zukić (born 1971), Bosnian footballer
- Muhieddine Itani (1929–2015), Lebanese footballer
- Muhieddine Jaroudi, Lebanese footballer
- Muhittin Akyüz (1870–1940), Turkish general, diplomat.
- Muhittin Baştürk (born 1991), German footballer
- Muhittin Böcek (born 1962), Turkish politician
- Muhittin Kurtiş (1876–1951), Turkish general.
- Muhittin Sarıçiçek (born 2000), Turkish wrestler
- Muhittin Sebati (1901–1931), Turkish painter
- Muhittin Serin (born 1945), calligrapher
- Muhittin Taylan (1910–1983), Turkish judge
- Muhiuddin Khan (1935–2016), Bangladeshi author
- Muhiuddin Khan Alamgir (born 1942), Bangladeshi economist and politician
- Muhyiddin of Brunei (1643–1690), Sultan of Brunei
- Muhyiddin Mansur Shah (died 1662), Sultan of Kedah
- Muhyiddin Yassin (born 1947), Malaysian former Prime Minister, politician
- Al-Sayyid Muhiyudin Abu Muhammad Abdul-Qadir Gilani Al-Hasani Wal-Hussaini (1077–1166), Sufi religious figure
- Şerif Muhiddin Targan (1892–1967), Turkish musician
- Taha Muhie-eldin Marouf (1929–2009), Iraqi-Kurdish politician

== Surname ==
- Bawa Muhaiyaddeen (died 1986), Sri Lankan Tamil Sufi mystic
- Nezihe Muhiddin (1889–1958), Ottoman and Turkish women's rights campaigner
- Twahir Muhiddin, Kenyan football coach
