= Mohyeldin Elzein =

MohyEldin Abd El Rahman Elzein, Arabic: محي الدين عبد الرحمن الزين, (June 7, 1943 – August 6, 2007) was the head of Urology and Surgery department in Fujairah Hospital, United Arab Emirates.

== Life and career ==
Born in Adbara Sudan in 1943, Elzein studied medicine in University of Khartoum and graduated with honors. His picture and credentials are still displayed in Khartoum University (Medicine). He continued his Education in the United Kingdom and got the Royal Membership of Surgery. He worked El Fasher in the Darfur region for the general hospital for free. He also opened a private clinic to help the people of El Fashir for free. The government and tribal people of El Fashir wanted to show their respect and admiration to the doctor by creating a festival that is being celebrated to this day in the honor of the doctor. By 1985 He left El Fashir and got a job in Al Fujairah, United Arab Emirates. and stayed there. There are many articles, poetry written about Elzein and his contribution to Urology and to the people of Darfur. Elzein Left behind his wife (Sameera Ramadan Hussain), four daughters (Rihab, Abeer, Jawaher, Tasneem) and three sons (Khalid, Mohamed, Salih).
