= Mohyeddin =

Masculine given name

Mohyeddin is an Arabic name meaning "Reviver of Dīn". It is used both as a personal name for males and as an honorific title in the Islamic tradition. Several notable figures, including scholars, philosophers, and theologians throughout Islamic history, have been known by this name.

== Etymology ==
The name Mohyeddin (Persian: محی‌الدین, Arabic: محیی الدین) is of Arabic origin. It combines two words: Mohy (Persian: محي), meaning "Reviver", and Din (Persian: دین), meaning "Religion" or "Faith". Therefore, Mohyeddin translates to "Reviver of the Faith" or "Reviver of Religion". As a religious title, this name is sometimes given to those who inspire others to follow Islam.

== Mohyeddin as a personal name ==
Mohyeddin serves as a first name for boys and also as a middle or family name among Muslims, especially in West Asia, South Asia, and Southeast Asia. It is found in many languages, including Arabic, Persian, Urdu, and Ottoman Turkish. Because of this spread across different regions, the name has developed various spellings and pronunciations. Common variations include Mohieddin, Muhyiddin, Muhiyyuddin, and Mohiuddin, which all carry the same meaning but reflect regional language influences.

The flexibility of the Arabic language allows for different forms and spellings of Mohyeddin to emerge in diverse Muslim communities. Variations may arise due to linguistic differences, historical influences, or local naming customs.

=== Combining the name with other names or titles ===
The name Mohyeddin has been combined with religious titles and other names to create meaningful identities. For example, in Iran and other Persian-speaking regions, Mohyeddin is sometimes paired with the religious title Seyed, forming the name Seyed Mohyeddin.

In history, the 12th-century Andalusian Muslim scholar and mystic, Ibn Arabi, is also known as Mohyeddin al-Arabi. The 14th Sultan of Brunei, Muhyeddin ibn Abdul Jalilul Akbar, is often referred to as Muhyiddin of Brunei.

=== Mohyeddin in the intellectual fields ===
Some scholars and writers who explored Islamic literature, philosophy, and theology have used the name Mohyeddin.

One early figure is Mohyeddin Abu Saeed Muhammad Neishabouri (1083–1153), an Iranian jurist and writer known for his works Al-Intsaf fi Masael al-Khilaf and Al-Mohit fi Sharh al-Vasit. Later, Mohyeddin Muhammad, better known as Aurangzeb (1618–1707), became the sixth Mughal emperor of India.

Another prominent figure during the Islamic Golden Age was Muhyieddin al-Maghribi(c. 1220–1283), a Spanish-born Arab astronomer and mathematician. He worked at the Maragheh observatory in the Ilkhanate, and wrote The Book on the Theorem of Menelaus and Treatise on the Calculation of Sines. Muhieddin Lari, a Persian writer who died in 1526, authored Futūḥ al-Ḥaramayn, a work in Islamic literature.

== Mohyeddin as a religious title ==
The designation of Mohyeddin as a title has a religious meaning in Islamic theology, related to tajdid, which means "renewal". Individuals in the Islamic faith are often given this title in recognition of their efforts to rejuvenate the spiritual aspects of Islam.

Some important people in history have held the religious title of Mohyeddin. Abu Abdullah Mohyeddin Muhammad, known as Ibn Arabi (1165–1240), was an Andalusian writer, poet, and Sufi mystic. He travelled to many Islamic countries and wrote important works, including The Meccan Illuminations (Al-Futūḥāt al-Makkiyya) and The Ringstones of Wisdom (Fusus al-Hikam). His writings are still influential in Islamic thought today.

== See also ==
- Mohyeddin, given name
- Muhiddin, Turkish surname
- Mohy al-Din, name
- Seghatoleslam, Family name and religious title
