= Mu'ayyad al-Din al-Urdi =

Arab astronomer (c1200–1266)

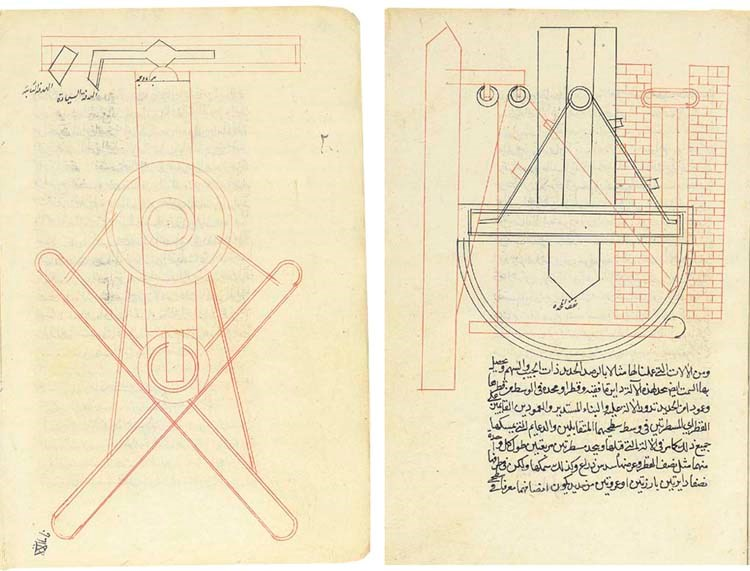
Manuscript of al-Urdi's Risala fi Kayfiyyat al-Arsad wa-ma Yuhtaju Ila 'ilmihi Wa-'Amalihi Min al-Turuq al-Mu'addiya ila Ma'rifat 'Awdat al-Kawakib. Copy created in Iran, dated 15th century

Al-Urdi (full name: Moayad Al-Din Al-Urdi Al-Amiri Al-Dimashqi) (Arabic: مؤيد الدين العرضي العامري الدمشقي) (d. 1266) was a medieval Syrian Arab astronomer and geometer.

Born circa 1200, presumably (from the nisba al‐ʿUrḍī) in the village of ʿUrḍ in the Syrian desert between Palmyra and Resafa, he moved to Damascus at some point before 1239, where he worked as an engineer and teacher of geometry, and built instruments for al-Malik al-Mansur of Hims. In 1259 he moved to Maragha in northwestern Iran, after being asked by Nasir al-Din al-Tusi to help establish the Maragha observatory under the patronage of Hulagu. Al-Urdi's most notable works are Risālat al-Raṣd, a treatise on observational instruments, and Kitāb al-Hayʾa (كتاب الهيئة), a work on theoretical astronomy. His influence can be seen on Bar Hebraeus and Qutb al-Din al-Shirazi, in addition to being quoted by Ibn al-Shatir.

Al-Urdi contributed to the construction of the observatory outside of the city, constructing special devices and water wheels in order to supply the observatory, which was built on a hill, with drinking water. He also constructed some of the instruments used in the observatory, in the year 1261/2. Al-Urdi's son, who also worked in the observatory, made a copy of his father's Kitāb al‐Hayʾa and also constructed a celestial globe in 1279.

Al-Urdi is a member of the group of Islamic astronomers of the 13th and 14th centuries who were active in the criticism of the astronomical model presented in Ptolemy's Almagest. Saliba (1979) identified Bodleian ms. Marsh 621 as a copy of Al-Urdi's Kitāb al-Hayʾa, based on which he argued that Al-Urdi's contributions predated Al-Tusi. Otto E. Neugebauer in 1957 argued that the works of this group of astronomers, perhaps via Ibn al-Shatir, must have been received in 15th-century Europe and ultimately influenced the works of Copernicus. This concerns the "Urdi lemma" in particular, an extension of Apollonius' theorem that allowed an equant in an astronomic model to be replaced with an equivalent epicycle that moved around a deferent centered at half the distance to the equant point.

== See also ==
- Zij-i Ilkhani
