= Ahmed Mohiuddin =

Pakistani scientist

- Born: 8 January 1923; Hyderabad, India
- Died: 4 January 1998 (aged 74); Atlanta, United States
- Education: Osmania University, India
- Awards: Pride of Performance Award by the President of Pakistan (1962)
- Scientific career
- Fields: Biology and zoology
- Workplaces: Osmania University, India; Karachi University, Pakistan; Sindh University, Pakistan; Quaid-e-Azam University, Pakistan; Allama Iqbal Open University, Pakistan; East-West University, United States

Ahmed Mohiuddin (Urdu: احمد محی الدین) (8 January 1923 – 4 January 1998) was a Pakistani scientist, scholar, and researcher.

== Early life and education ==
Ahmed Mohiuddin was born in Hyderabad, British India, where he received his early education. He obtained his MSc (Biology) from Osmania University in 1945 with distinction. In 1945 he was awarded a PhD scholarship by the government of Hyderabad. He did a PhD in Zoology in 1948 from the University of London. He returned to Hyderabad in 1948 and joined Osmania University as an associate professor.

== Career ==
Mohiuddin migrated to Pakistan in November 1948 and joined the Malaria Institute of Pakistan until 1952. From 1953 to 1960, he served at the Karachi University. Later he was transferred to Sindh University, Jamshoro as chairman of the Zoology Department. In 1978, Mohiuddin joined Quaid-e-Azam University as Vice Chancellor and later became Vice Chancellor of Allama Iqbal Open University in Islamabad, Pakistan. From 1986 to 1988, he served at the East-West University, Chicago.

Mohiuddin was the founder of the Pakistan Zoological Society. He was awarded a fellowship from Pakistan Academy of Sciences and Royal Society of Tropical Medicine.

Mohiuddin was a highly cited biologist and zoologist in Pakistan.

Nationally and internationally, 37 of his books have been published on science and research.

== Awards and recognition ==
- Pride of Performance Award by the President of Pakistan in 1962

== Death and legacy ==
Ahmed Mohiuddin died in Atlanta, US on 4 January 1998 at age 74.

In recognition of his services to the field of zoology, Zoological Society of Pakistan created the Ahmed Mohiuddin Memorial Gold Medal for talented students awarded nationally in Pakistan.
