= Muhyi al-Din al-Maghribi =

Medieval Spanish astronomer

Muhyi l'din
- محيي الدين المغربي
- Born: c. 1220 al-Andalus
- Died: June 1283; Maragheh

Academic work
- Era: Islamic Golden Age
- School or tradition: Maliki
- Main interests: Mathematics, astronomy, astrology

Muḥyī al‐Milla wa al‐Dīn Yaḥyā Abū ʿAbdallāh ibn Muḥammad ibn Abī al‐Shukr al‐Maghribī al‐Andalusī (Arabic: محيي الدين المغربي; c. 1220 – June 1283), referred to in sources as Muhyi l'din, was an astronomer, astrologer and mathematician of the Islamic Golden Age. He belonged to the group of astronomers associated with the Maragheh observatory in the Ilkhanate, most notably Nasir al-Din al-Tusi. In astronomy, Muhyi l'din carried out a large‐scale project of systematic planetary observations, which led to the development of several new astronomical parameters.

Muhyi l'din died in Maragheh in modern-day Iran in June 1283.

== Early career ==
Muhyi al-Dīn al-Maghribī was born in c. 1220 in al-Andalus. He worked for the Ayyubid sultan An-Nasir Yusuf in Damascus. This relationship was ultimately cut short when the sultan was killed by the Mongols in the Siege of Aleppo in 1257. He was then sent to the observatory at Maragheh.

== Work at the Maragheh observatory ==
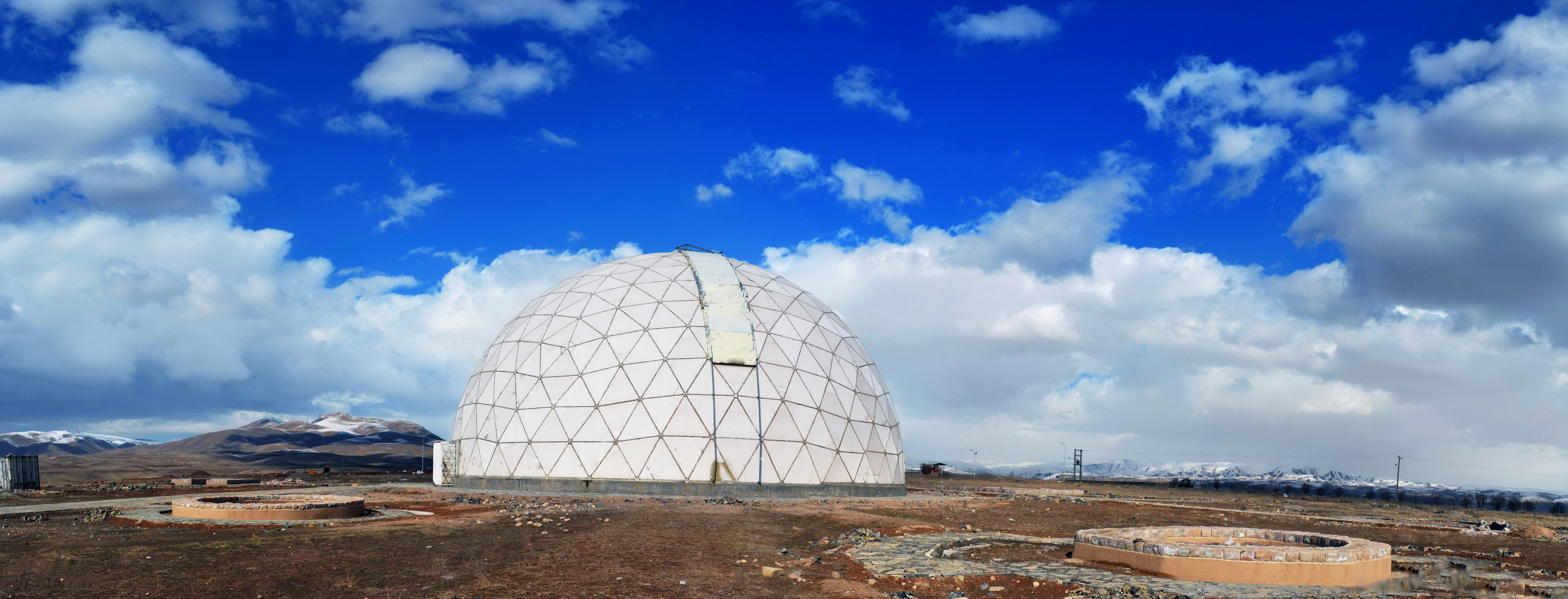
The site of the Maragheh observatory; a dome now protects the most important remains

The Maragheh observatory was founded in the Ilkhanate, a part of the Mongol Empire, Muhyi l'din went to Maragheh in 1258 as a guest of the Mongol ruler Hulagu Khan, where from 1259 he was involved, along with Nasir al-Din al-Tusi, in its construction. The observatory was completed in 1262.

At Maragheh, Muhyi l'din observed up to a total of eight of the brightest stars, of which he used the latitudes collected to compare with the values within ancient computations. He concluded that the difference between his latitudes and ancients were not substantial, and any inconsistences were in fact due to the observations and not the subject itself. In his Talkhīṣ al‐Majisṭī, he commentated on Ptolemy's Almagest, presenting his own observations and hypothesizes in addition with it. For instance, Muhyi l'din supposed that the precession would only occur in a motion that was uniform and continuous at a rate that was 1° for ever 66 years from his systematic stellar observations.

An extant manuscript by Muhyi l'din details of observations made from 1262 to 1274. He continued to work on his observations at Maragheh until his death in 1283.

== Other work ==
Muhyi l'din considered the problem of doubling the cube, which he approached means of a method devised by the Greek mathematician Hippocrates of Chios.

== Commentaries and treatises ==
=== Astronomy ===
Muhyi l'din's known works on astronomy include:

- Tasṭīḥ al‐asṭurlāb, a description of the construction and use of the astrolabe;
- Maqāla fī istikhrāj taʿdīl al‐nahār wa saʿat al‐mashriq wa‐ʾl‐dāʾir min al‐falak bi‐ṭarīq al‐handasa, a description of the geometrical methods used to determine the meridian line, the rising amplitude, and the revolution of the sphere;
- Risālat al‐Khaṭā wa‐ʾl‐īghūr, a chronological work on the Chinese calendar, which was later translated from Arabic and Persian into Chinese.
- Three zījes:
  - Tāj al‐azyāj wa‐ghunyat al‐muḥtāj (The Crown of Astronomical Handbooks), also known as al‐muṣaḥḥaḥ bi‐adwār al‐anwār maʿa al‐raṣad wa‐ʾl‐iʿtibār;
  - Adwār al‐anwār madā al‐duhūr wa‐ʾl‐akwār, which contains astronomical observations carried out by Muhyi l'dinin Marāgha;
  - ʿUmdat al‐ḥāsib wa‐ghunyat al‐ṭālib;
- Three commentaries on Ptolemy's Almagest:
  - Talkhīṣ al‐Majisṭī (Compendium of the Almagest), based on his observations carried out between 1264 and 1275;
  - Khulāṣat al‐Majisṭī (Summary of the Almagest);
  - Muqaddimāt tataʿallaq bi‐ḥarakāt al‐kawākib (Prolegomena on the Motion of the Stars), which contains five geometric premises on the planetary motions in the Almagest.

=== Astrology ===
Muhyi l'din's astrological works were mainly devoted to horoscopes and planetary conjunctions, used to tell the future.

=== Mathematics ===
Muhyi l'din's notable works in trigonometry were The Book on the Theorem of Menelaus and Treatise on the Calculation of Sines. He is known for his commentaries on ancient Greek mathematical works, in particular, his commentary on Book XV of Euclid's Elements, which discussed measurements of the regular polyhedra. Muhyi l'din's writings on trigonometry contain some elements that are original.

In his treatise on the calculation of sines, Muhyi l'din interpolated a value for the sine of one degree; a more accurate value was not obtained until the 15th century, when the mathematicians Qāḍī Zāda al-Rūmī and Jamshid al-Kashi tackled the problem. Whilst working on the sines, Muhyi l'din used the methods devised by Archimedes to find an approximate value for pi.

== Sources ==
- Comes, Mercè (2007). "Ibn Abī al‐Shukr: Muḥyī al‐Milla wa‐ʾl‐Dīn Yaḥyā Abū ʿAbdallāh ibn Muḥammad ibn Abī al‐Shukr al‐Maghribī al‐Andalusī [al‐Qurṭubī]". In Hockey, Thomas; et al. (eds.). Biographical Encyclopedia of Astronomers. New York: Springer Publishers. pp. 548–549. doi:10.1007/978-0-387-30400-7_1433. ISBN 978-1-4419-9918-4. (PDF version)
- Mozaffari, S. Mohammad (2014). "Muḥyī al-Dīn al-Maghribī's lunar measurements at the Maragha observatory". Archive for History of Exact Sciences. 68 (1): 67–120. doi:10.1007/s00407-013-0130-4. ISSN 0003-9519. JSTOR 24569613.
- Roberts, Victor (1966). "The Planetary Theory of Ibn al-Shatir: Latitudes of the Planets". Isis. 50 (3). Chicago: The University of Chicago Press: 208–219. JSTOR 227960.
- Mozaffari, S. Mohammad (2016). "A forgotten solar model". Archive for History of Exact Sciences. 70 (3). Springer Nature: 267–291. doi:10.1007/s00407-015-0167-7. ISSN 0003-9519. JSTOR 24913461.
- O'Connor, J.J.; Robertson, E.F. (1999). "Muhyi l'din al-Maghribi". MacTutor. University of St Andrews.
- Tekeli, Sevim (1981). "Muḥyi 'L-Dīn Al-Maghribī (Muḥyi 'I-Milla Wa 'L-Dīn Yaḥyā Ibn Muḥammad Ibn Abi 'I-Shukr Al-Maghribī' Al-Andalusī)". In Gillispie, Charles Coulston; Holmes, Frederic Lawrence (eds.). Dictionary of Scientific Biography. Vol. 9. New York: Scribner. OCLC 755137603.
