= Maragheh observatory =

Historic Persian astronomical observatory

Coordinates: 37°23′46″N 46°12′33″E

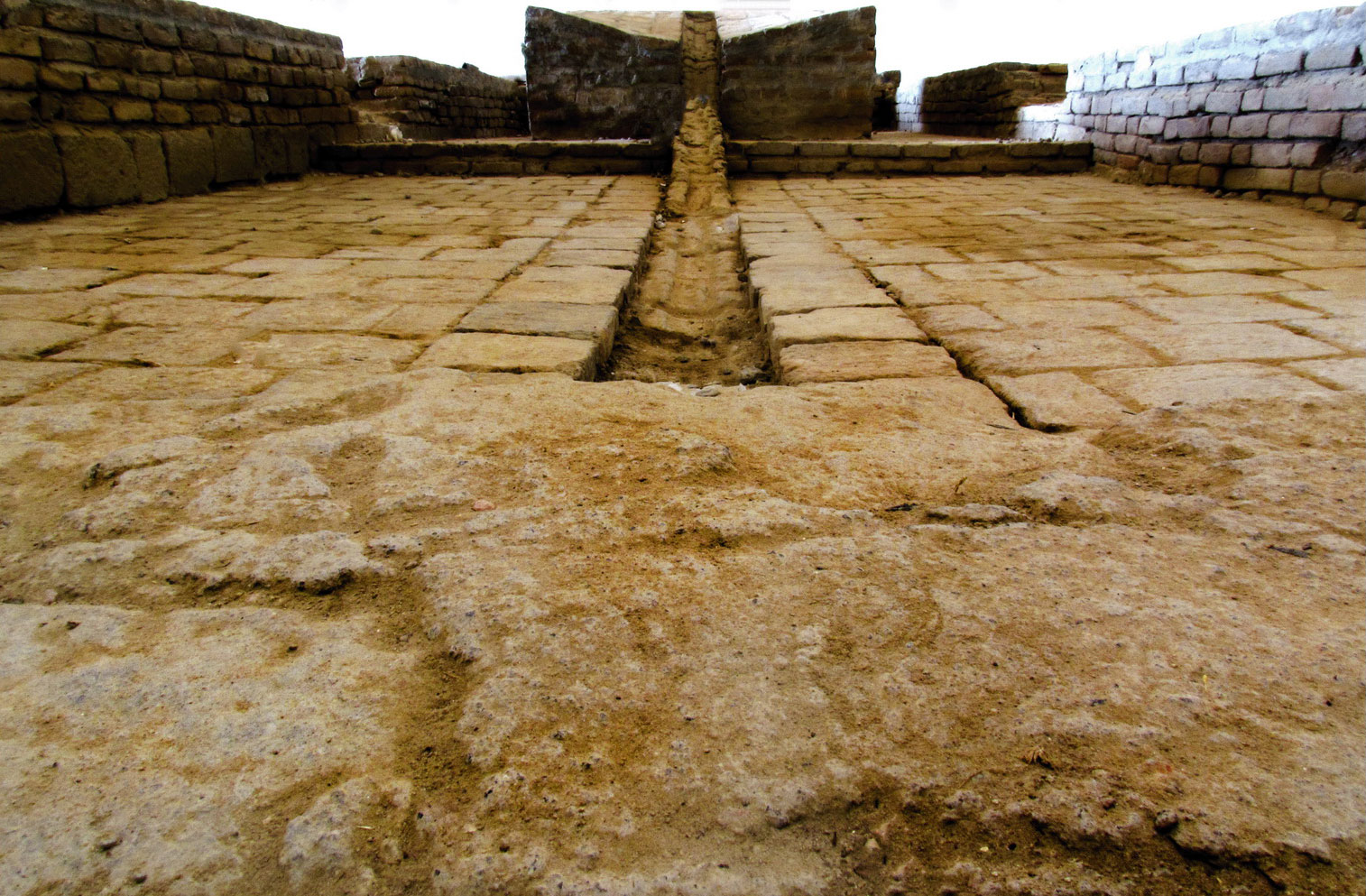
Central Tower of the Maragheh Observatory

The Maragheh observatory (Persian: رصدخانه مراغه), also spelled Maragha, Maragah, Marageh, and Maraga, was an astronomical observatory established in the mid 13th century under the patronage of the Ilkhanid Hulagu and the directorship of Nasir al-Din al-Tusi, a Persian scientist and astronomer. The observatory is located on the west side of Maragheh, which is situated in today's East Azerbaijan Province of Iran. It was considered one of the most advanced scientific institutions in Eurasia because it was a center for many groundbreaking calculations in mathematics and astronomy. It housed a large collection of astronomical instruments and books and it served as an educational institution. It was also used as a model for the later Ulugh Beg Observatory in Samarkand, the Taqi al-Din observatory in Constantinople, and Jantar Mantar observatory in Jaipur.

== History ==
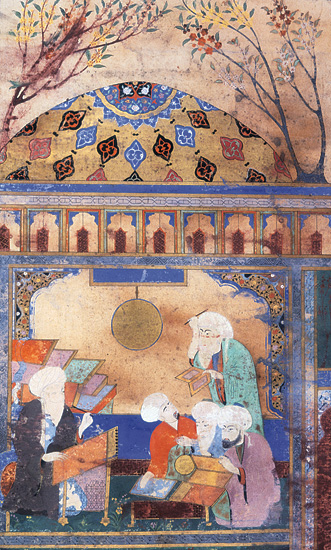
Painting of Al-Tusi and colleagues working on the Zij-i Ilkhani at the observatory

=== Background and pre-Mongol conquest ===
The region of Alamut was previously held by the Nizaris, a sect of Shia Islam also referred to as the Assassins or Hashashins.

=== Mongol conquest and establishment of the conservatory ===
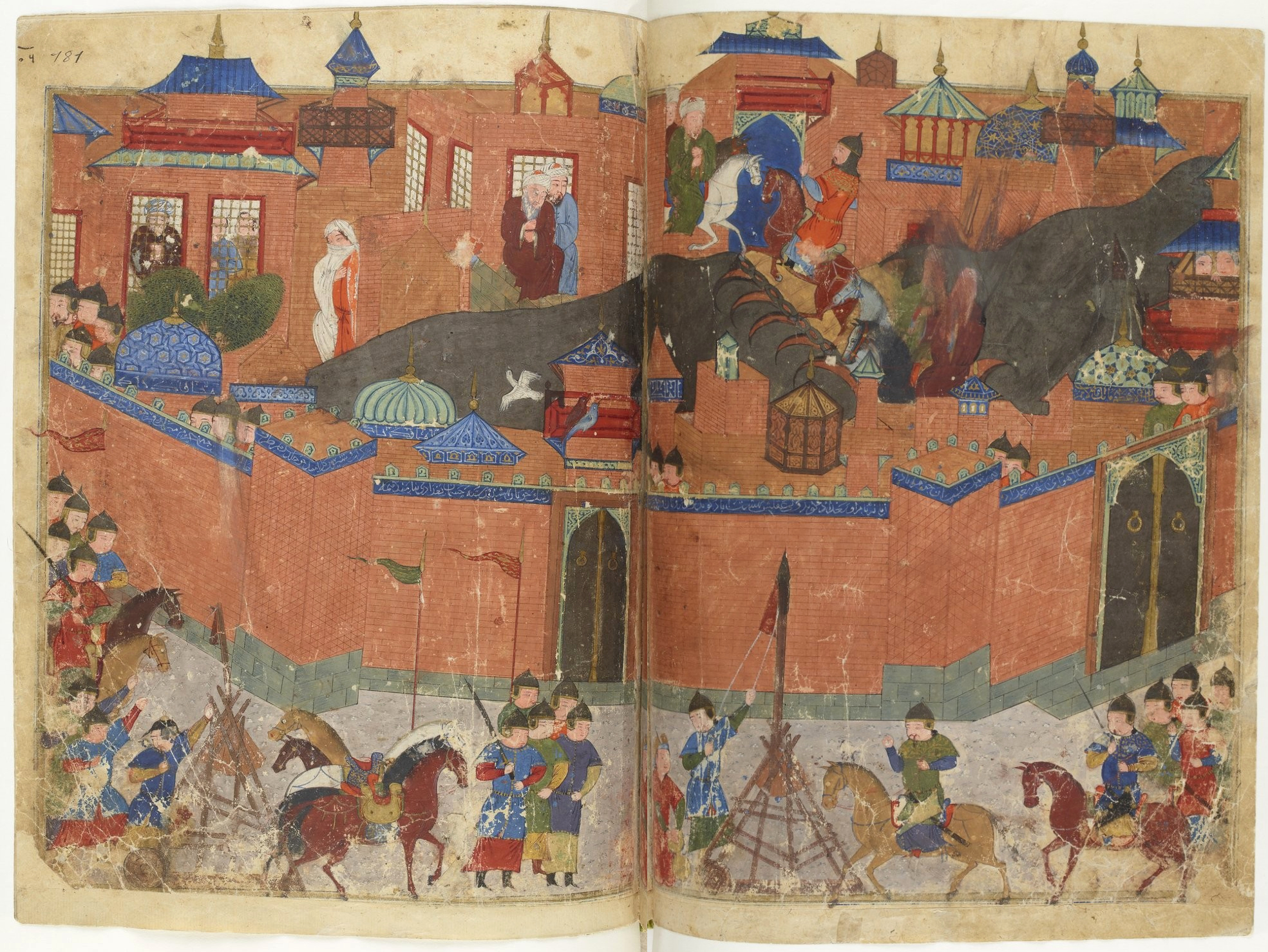
Painting depicting Hulagu's capture of Baghdad

Hulagu Khan was a Mongol ruler and the grandson of Genghis Khan. As the Mongols expanded their territory Hulagu was put in charge of conquering Mesopotamia, Persia, Egypt, Syria, and the Abbasid Caliphate, the territory that would become the Ilkhanate. From 1253 to 1256, Hulagu and his army were waging a campaign of conquest against the Nizaris in the Iranian region of Alamut. In 1256, the Mongols took the Alamut castle, where al-Tusi and several other scholars had taken refuge to continue their studies. However, there is dispute over whether or not al-Tusi was held by the Nizaris against his will, or even assisted the Mongols in their attack.

Hulagu respected al-Tusi for his scholarship in science and decided to appoint him as a wazir (vizier). Hulagu and his men took al-Tusi with them as they then went to sack Baghdad. In the newly formed Ilkhanate, al-Tusi was placed in charge of waqfs, a type of religious endowments, which Hulagu would later order him to use to build and fund the observatory. Prior to 1259, al-Tusi spoke to Hulagu about the need for new astronomy tables; due to his own interest in astrology, the Khan responded by authorizing the funding and construction of the Maragheh observatory, and later made Maragheh the capital of the Ilkhanate. In one account, Al-Tusi took advantage of Hulagu's superstitions, and told him that he could predict the future if he would sponsor the observatory. A second account suggests that Hulagu's brother, Mongke Khan had a great interest in mathematics and astronomy, and this influenced Hulagu's decision to reach out to al-Tusi to construct the observatory. Regardless of the original reasons for the construction, Hulagu became the first ruler to fund an observatory by sponsoring its construction with a waqf.

==== Construction and use of the site ====
The construction of the observatory began in 1259 and lasted between 3 and 5 years. Some speculate that after Mongke's death, there was a short period when construction came to a halt. Mu'ayyad al-Din 'Urdi was then appointed to be in charge of construction. Hulagu gave al-Tusi permission to build a new observatory in the location of his choosing, and al-Tusi chose the town of Maragha in modern-day Iran. Al-Tusi was the first director of the observatory, and he oversaw the placement of new instruments, recruitment of staff, the stocking of an integrated library, and was appointed administrator of the observatory's endowment.

==== The physical site ====
The site for the observatory was situated outside of Maragheh city on a flat-topped hill, which spanned about 400 meters in length by 150 meters in width. The layout of the site consisted of one central tower and five other circular platforms. The site also included a building dedicated to metalworking (for the creation of astronomical tools), as well as living quarters. The site also contained a large dome, the purpose of which was to allow the resident astronomers to measure the placement and motion of the sun.

== Notable scientists ==
Men of mathematics, science, and astronomy came to the Maragheh Observatory from across the Islamic world and further. According to texts recovered from the observatory, the site had a reputation so widespread it had reached as far as China as students had traveled to study mathematics, physics, and astronomy. Evidence has been found to suggest a major focus on education; student oriented texts have been discovered that offer introductions to mathematical astronomy and astronomical tables. Scholars in attendance included Bar-Hebraeus, who late in his life took residence close to the observatory in order to use the library for his studies; he left a description of the observatory.

A number of other prominent astronomers worked with Tusi at the observatory, such as Muhyi al-Din al-Maghribi, Mu'ayyid al-Din al-'Urdi, from Damascus, Qutb al-Din al-Shirazi, and Hulagu's Chinese astronomer Fao Munji, whose Chinese astronomical experience brought improvements to the Ptolemaic system used by Tusi.

After 12 years of intense work by al-Tusi and other scientists, including Mu'yed al-Din al-Arad-Najmedin Cathy, Najmd al-Din Qazvini, Allame Qutbuddin Shirazi, and Fakhruddin Maraghi, the tables were compiled in the Zij-i Ilkhani. The tables were published during the reign of Abaqa Khan, Hulagu's son, and were named after the patron of the observatory.

=== Nasir al-Din al-Tusi ===
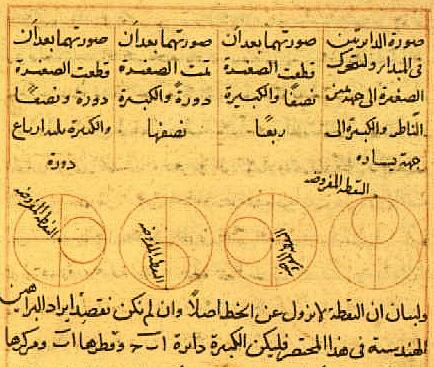
Tusi couple from Vat. Arabic ms 319

Nasir Al-Din al-Tusi was the lead astronomer and first director of the observatory. His most notable work was the creation of the Tusi-couple, a geometric based system that solved some of the fundamental issues with Ptolemaic calculations. Other notable works were revisions to Euclid's Elements and Ptolemy's Almagest as well as the astronomical handbook titled Zīj-i Īlkhānī or Ilkhanic Tables detailing the movement of the planets. About 350 years before Galileo had viewed the Milky Way through his telescope, Tusi had already offered his own thoughts on the galaxy, stating that the "milky" color was likely due to clusters of small stars.

=== Mu'ayyid al-Din al-'Urdi ===
Mu'ayyid al-Din al-'Urdi was an astronomer and engineer who was in charge of constructing the buildings of observatory as well as manufacturing the astronomical instruments. It is believed that he also played a key role in designing the "complex system of water wheels" for the observatory. In his detailed account of the instruments, he lists the Mural quadrant and the Armillary Sphere as two of the instruments he designed for the observatory. The Celestial Globe however was likely crafted around 1300 by Muhammad, the son of Mu'ayyad al-Din al-Urdi whose signature can be found on the globe. It is made out of brass with silver and gold inlay and was acquired in 1562 by Augustus, Elector of Saxony.

=== Decline and legacy ===
The decline of the Maragheh observatory began in the 13th century. The observatory survived during the reign of seven rulers of the dynasty, including the reigns of Abaqa and Uljaytu. After al-Tusi's death, his son Sadr al-Din succeeded him as director of the observatory. During Uljaytu's reign, he appointed al-Tusi's other son, 'Asil al-Din as director. Scholars and students of mathematics, science, and astronomy came to the Maragheh Observatory from across the Islamic world and up to the eastern borders of China. Like other madrasas constructed in Islamic structures at the time, the observatory also served as an educational institution, focused on teaching astronomy and providing hands-on experience with the available instruments.

At the time, the Maragheh Observatory was the first observatory to outlive its founder, remaining active for more than 50 years, with over a hundred astronomers conducting research in the facility during its lifespan. The stagnation and downturn of the Maragheh observatory began in the late 13th century. A major blow came when the observatory lost its patronage after the deaths of Hulagu in 1265 and his son Abaqa in 1282. Over time the site turned to ruins as a result of frequent earthquakes and a lack of funding. Over centuries of enduring conflict in the region, the contents of the observatory's library were stolen or destroyed. Shah Abbas the Great of Persia arranged for repair sometime in the early 17th century, but the Shah died before the restoration could begin.The observatory became inactive by the beginning of the 14th century, but the design influenced several other observatories. One example is the Ulugh-Bey observatory, located in Samarkand, Uzbekistan. This observatory, built in the 1420s, was similar in scale to the Maragheh Observatory. The Ulugh-Bey Observatory later served as a reference for European observatories.

Hulagu's older brother, Khublai Khan, also constructed an observatory, the Gaocheng Astronomical Observatory in China. A celestial globe from the observatory made around 1279 is now preserved in Dresden, Germany. It is a rare example of decorative art from Iran of the 13th century, designed by al-Urdi and made of bronze inlaid with silver and gold.

== Renewed academic interest ==
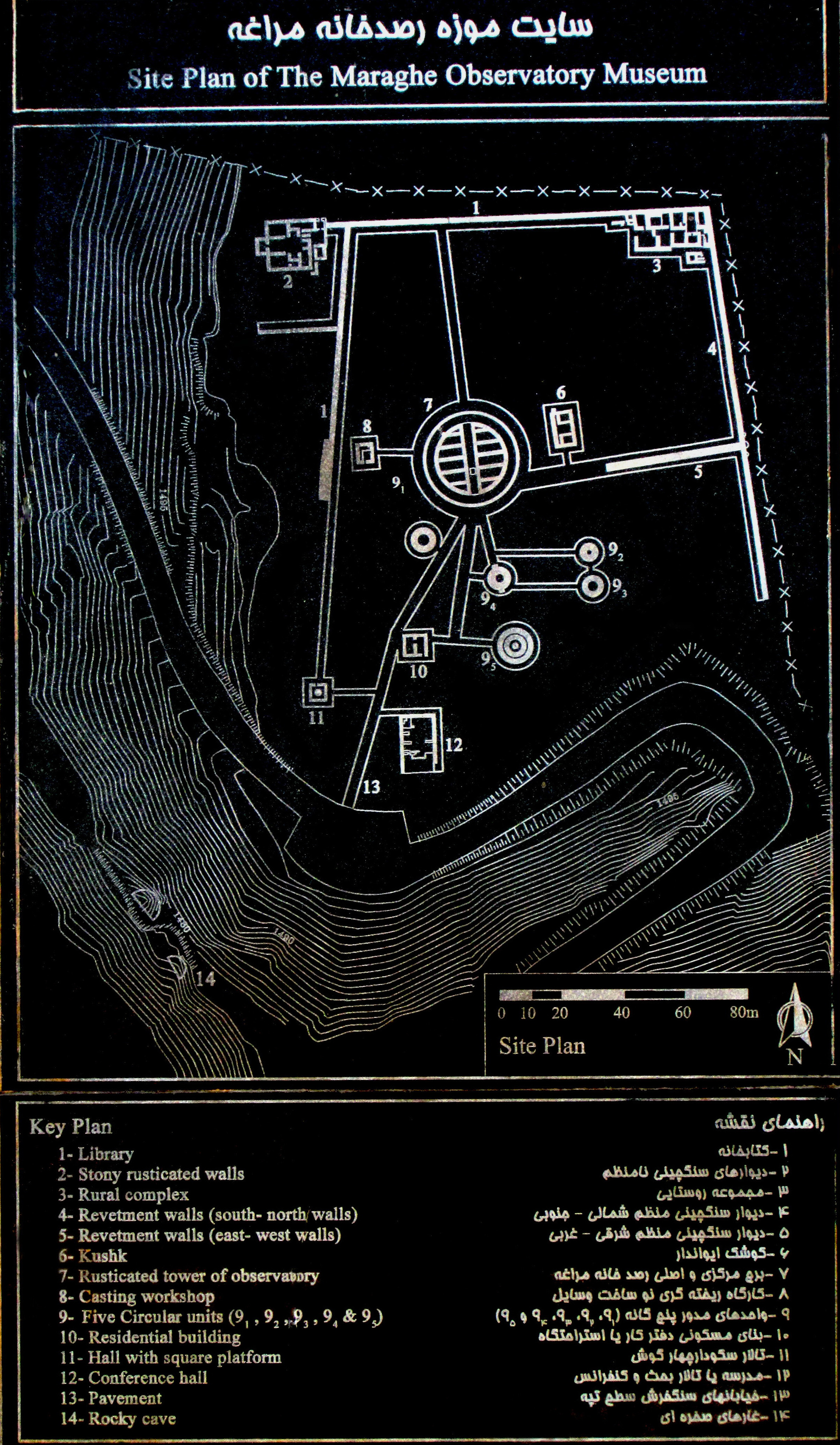
Site plan of the Maragheh Observatory

The Maragheh observatory was excavated by the Iranian archeologist Parviz Varjavand in 1972 after his work was commissioned by the University of Tehran and the University of Tabriz. Before this excavation there had been no modern archaeological research conducted into this ancient scientific site.

The excavation took place on a hill located west of the town of Maragheh where the central tower along with numerous other architectural units were unearthed including a residence for Hulagu and a mosque. The central tower had a circular plan and was divided by a long corridor so that there were six spaces on either side. It was the main space in which observations took place as well as scientific documents were kept. Smaller circular units were found near the central tower, which are thought to have been the platforms on which astronomical instruments were placed. A casting workshop, a school building as well as a large library was part of the scientific research complex of the observatory

Fragments of glass and pottery were found as well as copper coins and a gold coin from the IIkhanid period. A variety of architectural stones (brick, carved and engraved stone, glazed tile) which were used for the construction and the ornamentation of the buildings were also discovered.

On the west side of the hill, Varjavand also came across the so-called the Rasadkhana caves with temple like rock structures which resemble Chinese and Mongol religious architectural styles. These underground spaces are believed to have been used by visitors for religious ceremonies during the Ilkhanid period.

== Preserving the site ==
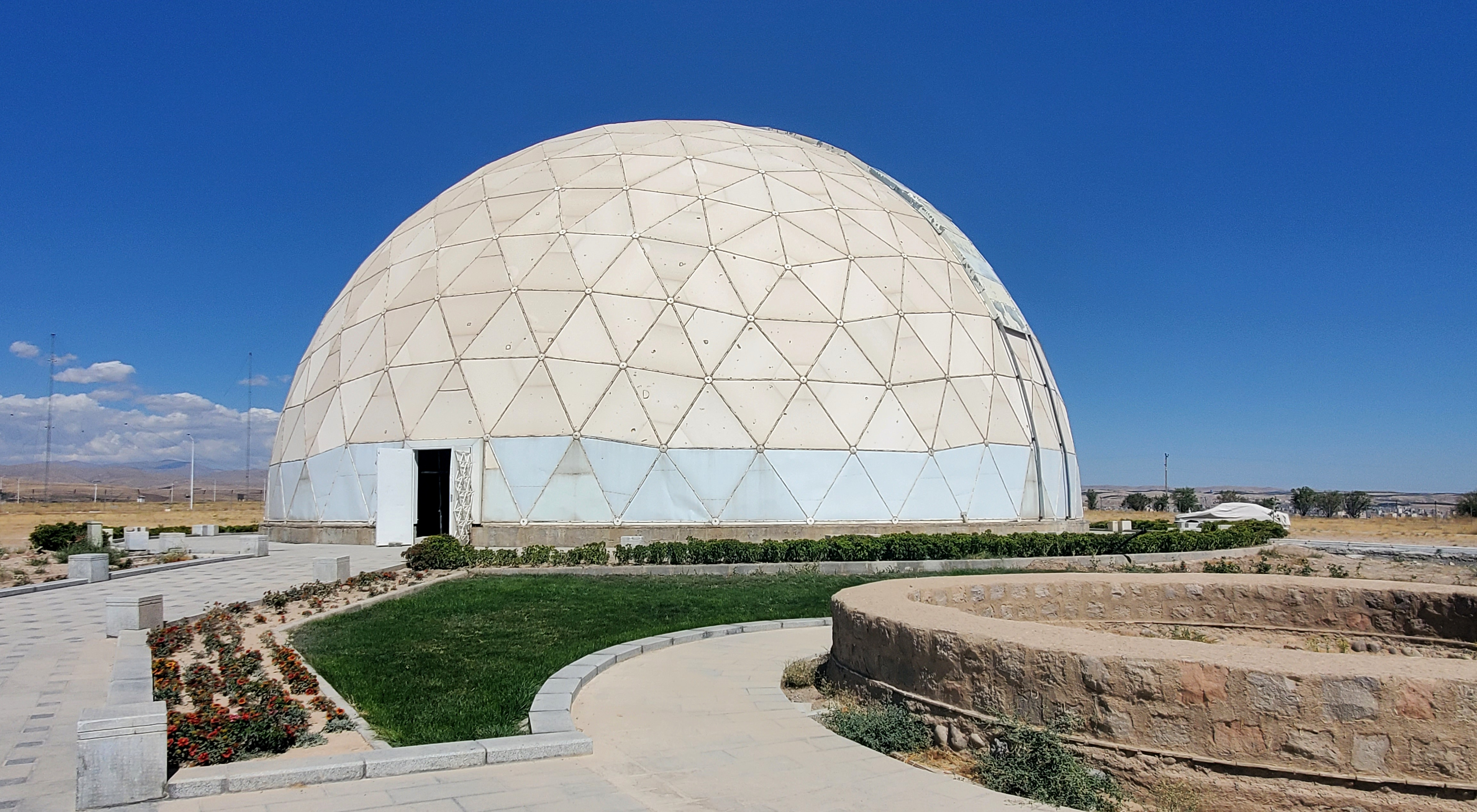
Dome of the Maragheh observatory

In recent years, interest has increased in the historical significance of this site. A dome shaped cover has been built to protect the remnants of the observatory. Nearby Tabriz University has been responsible for the management and protection of the Maragheh site since the late 70s. In collaboration with the municipality of Maragheh, there are new renovation projects that are being conducted to preserve the site

== See also ==
- List of astronomical observatories
