= Ipse dixit =

Assertion without proof

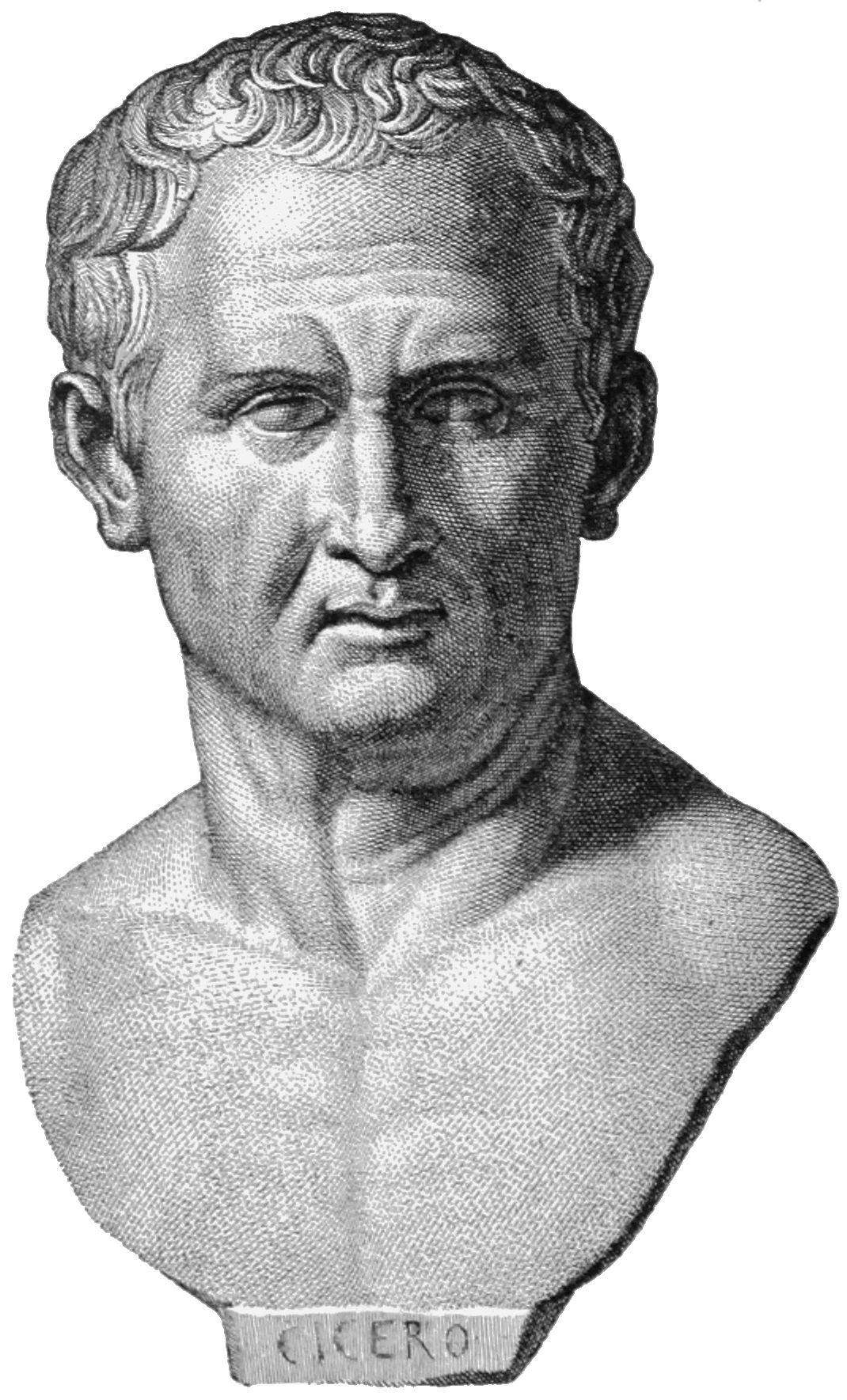
The Roman politician Marcus Tullius Cicero coined the phrase ipse dixit, which translates from the Latin as "he said it himself".

Ipse dixit (Latin for "he said it himself") is an assertion without proof, or a dogmatic expression of opinion.

The fallacy of defending a proposition by baldly asserting that it is "just how it is" distorts the argument by opting out of it entirely: the claimant declares an issue to be intrinsic and immutable.

== History ==
The Latin form of the expression comes from the Roman orator and philosopher Marcus Tullius Cicero (106–43 BC) in his theological studies De Natura Deorum (On the Nature of the Gods) and is his translation of the Greek expression (with the identical meaning) autòs épha (αὐτὸς ἔφα), an argument from authority made by the disciples of Pythagoras when appealing to the pronouncements of the master rather than to reason or evidence.

Before the early 17th century, scholastics applied the ipse dixit term to justify their subject-matter arguments if the arguments previously had been used by the ancient Greek philosopher Aristotle (384–322 BC).

=== Ipse-dixitism ===
In the late 18th century, Jeremy Bentham adapted the term ipse dixit into the word ipse-dixitism. Bentham coined the term to apply to all non-utilitarian political arguments.

=== Legal usage ===
In modern legal and administrative decisions, the term ipse dixit has generally been used as a criticism of arguments based solely upon the authority of an individual or organization. For example, in National Tire Dealers & Retreaders Association, Inc. v. Brinegar, 491 F.2d 31, 40 (D.C. Cir. 1974), Circuit Judge Wilkey considered that the Secretary of Transportation's "statement of the reasons for his conclusion that the requirements are practicable is not so inherently plausible that the court can accept it on the agency's mere ipse dixit."

In 1997, the Supreme Court of the United States recognized the problem of "opinion evidence which is connected to existing data only by the ipse dixit of an expert." Likewise, the Supreme Court of Texas has held "a claim will not stand or fall on the mere ipse dixit of a credentialed witness." "[W]hen you come across an argument that you recall the majority took issue with," U.S. Supreme Court Justice Elena Kagan advised readers of her dissent in 2023's Andy Warhol Foundation for the Visual Arts, Inc. v. Goldsmith, "go back to its response and ask yourself about the ratio of reasoning to ipse dixit."

In 1858, Abraham Lincoln said in his speech at Freeport, Illinois, at the second joint debate with Stephen A. Douglas:

I pass one or two points I have because my time will very soon expire, but I must be allowed to say that Judge Douglas recurs again, as he did upon one or two other occasions, to the enormity of Lincoln,—an insignificant individual like Lincoln,— upon his ipse dixit charging a conspiracy upon a large number of members of Congress, the Supreme Court, and two Presidents, to nationalize slavery. I want to say that, in the first place, I have made no charge of any sort upon my ipse dixit. I have only arrayed the evidence tending to prove it, and presented it to the understanding of others, saying what I think it proves, but giving you the means of judging whether it proves it or not. This is precisely what I have done. I have not placed it upon my ipse dixit at all.

In his June 12, 2025 ruling in Newsom v. Trump, Judge Charles R. Breyer said of one of the defendants' arguments "This is classic ipse dixit."

== See also ==
- Circular reasoning
- Just-so story
- Truthiness
