= Charles Breyer =

American judge (born 1941)

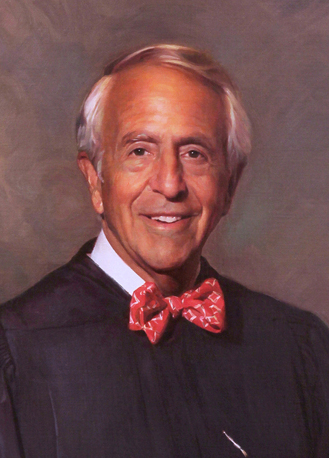

Chair of the United States Sentencing Commission
- Acting; December 2018 – August 5, 2022
- President: Donald Trump; Joe Biden
- Preceded by: William H. Pryor Jr.
- Succeeded by: Carlton W. Reeves

Senior Judge of the United States District Court for the Northern District of California
- Incumbent
- Assumed office December 31, 2011

Judge of the United States District Court for the Northern District of California
- In office November 12, 1997 – December 31, 2011
- Appointed by: Bill Clinton
- Preceded by: D. Lowell Jensen
- Succeeded by: William Orrick III

Personal details
- Born: Charles Roberts Breyer; November 3, 1941 (age 84) San Francisco, California, U.S.
- Relatives: Stephen Breyer (brother)
- Education: Harvard University (BA); University of California, Berkeley (JD)

Charles Roberts Breyer (born November 3, 1941) is a senior United States district judge of the United States District Court for the Northern District of California. Breyer served as chairman of the United States Sentencing Commission from 2018 to 2022.

== Early life and career ==
Breyer was born to a Jewish family in San Francisco, California. He is the younger brother of Stephen Breyer, who served as a justice of the U.S. Supreme Court from 1994 to 2022. Charles and Stephen were active in the Boy Scouts of America and achieved the Eagle Scout rank.

Breyer attended Lowell High School. He received a Bachelor of Arts degree from Harvard College in 1963 and a Juris Doctor from the University of California, Berkeley, in 1966. He was a law clerk to Judge Oliver Carter of the United States District Court for the Northern District of California from 1966 to 1967. He was a counsel for the Legal Aid Society of San Francisco in 1967, and then an assistant district attorney for the City and County of San Francisco, California, from 1967 to 1973.

Breyer was an assistant special prosecutor on the Watergate Special Prosecution Force from August, 1973 to November, 1974 and then entered private practice in San Francisco from 1974 to 1997, interrupted by a brief stint again as chief assistant district attorney of the City and County of San Francisco in 1979.

== Federal judicial service ==
On July 24, 1997, Breyer was nominated by President Bill Clinton to a seat on the United States District Court for the Northern District of California vacated by D. Lowell Jensen. He was confirmed by the United States Senate on November 8, 1997, and received his commission on November 12, 1997. He took senior status on December 31, 2011. He served as a member of the United States Judicial Conference from 2006 to 2010. He served as a Member of the United States Judicial Panel on Multidistrict Litigation from 2011 to 2018. He served as vice chair of the United States Sentencing Commission from 2013 to 2016 and as a member of the same commission from 2017 to 2022.

Stephen Breyer has recused himself from appeals of cases tried by his brother, including Olympic Airways v. Husain, Department of Housing and Urban Development v. Rucker, United States v. Oakland Cannabis Buyers’ Cooperative, Monsanto Co. v. Geertson Seed Farms, Amgen, Inc. v. Connecticut Retirement Plans and Trust Funds and City and County of San Francisco v. Sheehan.

=== Notable cases ===
- Breyer presided over the Ed Rosenthal trial in 2007, a federal prosecution for distribution of marijuana for medical use. The case was controversial because Breyer sentenced Rosenthal, who faced a possible sentence of 100 years for growing marijuana, to just one day in prison. He also presided over the stock-options backdating trial of Brocade Communications Systems CEO Gregory Reyes in 2007.
- In 2014, he ruled against the city of San Francisco's legislation to protect tenants from Ellis Act evictions. He presided over the 2014 criminal case involving San Francisco police theft and racist texting, in which his court order was blamed for the delay in releasing information.
- Following the Volkswagen emissions scandal, Breyer had approved a $16.5 billion settlement for US consumers. Volkswagen agreed to redeem an estimated 475,000 diesel automobiles in the US.
- In June 2025, he ruled against the Trump administration's federalization of the California National Guard in Newsom v. Trump, but the administration appealed and a stay of the ruling was issued hours later. Later, he ruled that the administration could not use National Guard or military troops for civilian law enforcement in California. On December 10, 2025, Breyer issued a ruling ordering the National Guard deployment in Los Angeles to end and that control of the Guard be returned to California Gov. Gavin Newsom. On December 12, an appellate court upheld Breyer's order to end the deployment, but ordered that the troops remain under the Trump administration's control.

=== Articles of Impeachment ===
On June 27, 2025 Rep. Randy Fine of Florida's 6th district filed House Resolution 556, articles of impeachment against Senior District Judge Charles R. Breyer, "for high crimes and misdemeanors."

== Personal life ==
Breyer was married to the late Sydney Goldstein, who founded City Arts & Lectures in San Francisco in 1980 and in whose honor the Nourse Theater was renamed after her death in 2018.

== See also ==
- List of Jewish American jurists

Legal offices
Preceded by D. Lowell Jensen	Judge of the United States District Court for the Northern District of California; 1997–2011	Succeeded by William Orrick III
