= Unit-point atomism =

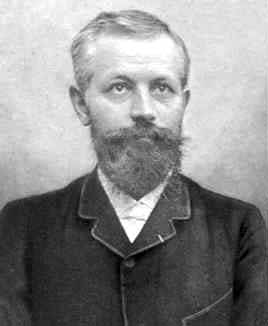
Paul Tannery, early theoriser of a Pythagorean "unit-point atomism"

According to some twentieth-century philosophers, unit-point atomism was the philosophy of the Pythagoreans, a conscious repudiation of Parmenides and the Eleatics. It stated that atoms were infinitesimally small ("point") yet possessed corporeality. It was a predecessor of Democritean atomism. Most recent students of presocratic philosophy, such as Kurt von Fritz, Walter Burkert, Gregory Vlastos, Jonathan Barnes, and Daniel W. Graham have rejected that any form of atomism can be applied to the early Pythagoreans (before Ecphantus of Syracuse).

Unit-point atomism was invoked in order to make sense of a statement ascribed to Zeno of Elea in Plato's Parmenides: "these writings of mine were meant to protect the arguments of Parmenides against those who make fun of him. . . My answer is addressed to the partisans of the many. . ." The anti-Parmenidean pluralists were supposedly unit-point atomists whose philosophy was essentially a reaction against the Eleatics. This hypothesis, however, to explain Zeno's paradoxes, has been thoroughly discredited.
