= Pourquoi story =

Narrative that explains why something is the way it is, generally fabulous or mythical

A pourquoi story (French pronunciation: [puʁ.kwa]; "pourquoi" meaning "why" in French) also called an origin story, pourquoi tale, or an etiological tale, is a fictional narrative that explains why something is the way it is, for example why snakes have no legs or why tigers have striped coats. Many legends, origin myths and folk tales are pourquoi stories. A more pejorative term for these stories is a just-so story, coined by English writer Rudyard Kipling in 1902.

== Examples ==
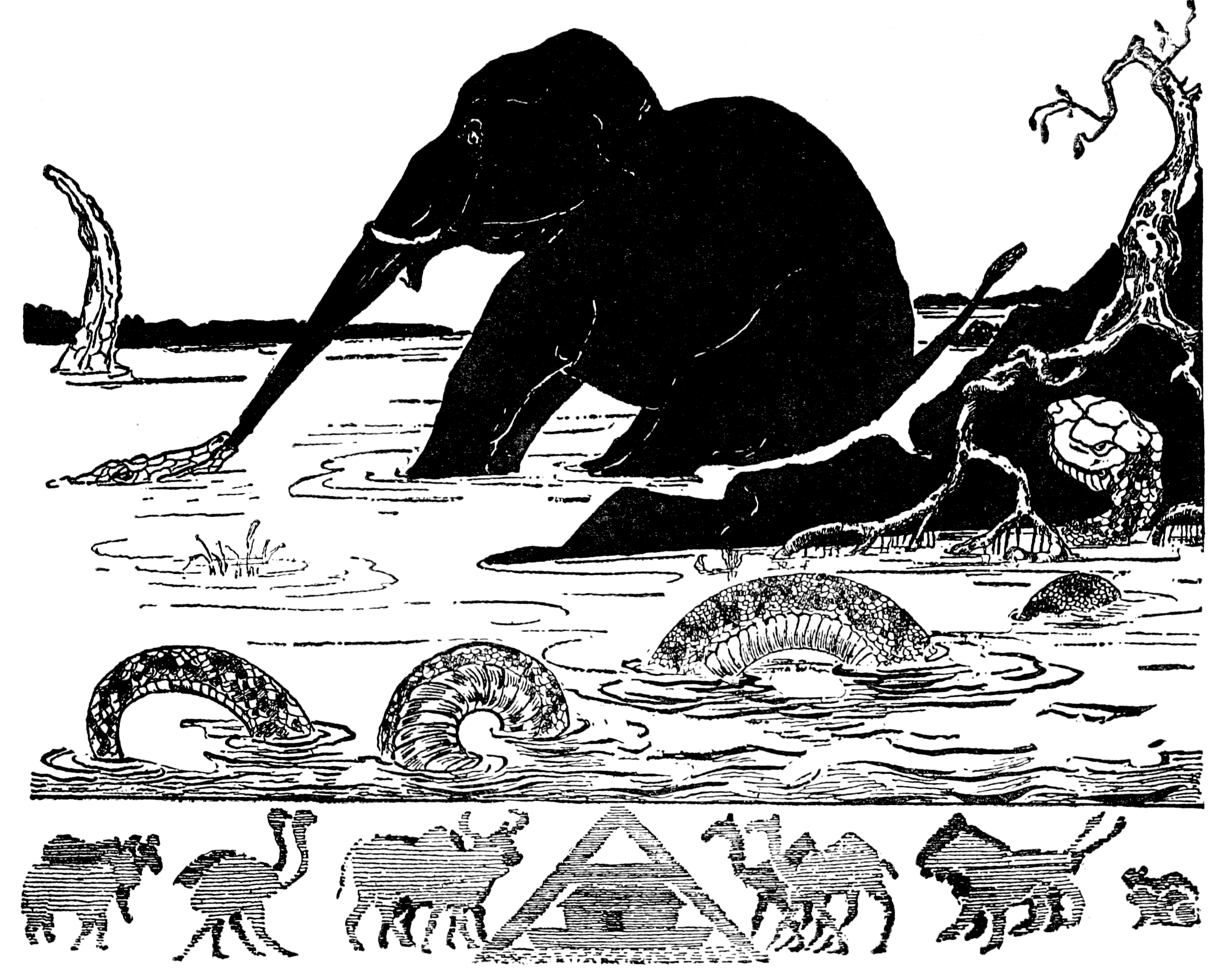
Illustration for Kipling's "Just-So Story" of "How the Elephant Got His Trunk"

Pourquoi stories include:

- Just So Stories by Rudyard Kipling, many of which give explanations for the origin of animals and their characteristics.
- Australian Aboriginal dreamtime stories, such as the Rainbow Serpent.
- Certain tall tales include pourquoi elements, such as Pecos Bill taming his horse, Widowmaker. The horse bucked and kicked so much that she dug out the Grand Canyon.
- The Epic of Gilgamesh includes many pourquoi stories from Mesopotamian folklore, such as how the Beqa'a Valley was formed, why meat becomes rancid when left in the rain, and why snakes shed their skins while people (who are mortal) do not.
- Origin stories, explaining how a comic book hero or heroine came to have their special characteristics.
- Alamat, loosely translated into "legend", are stories in Philippine folk literature which explain how things came to be. They normally involve people being transformed into animals and plants because of certain untoward habits they have. An example would be the Alamat of the Pineapple where a girl who is too lazy to look for things is transformed into a fruit with numerous "eyes".
- Tinga Tinga Tales include many pourquoi stories from African cultures, such as "Why Giraffe has a Long Neck", "Why Crocodile has a Bumpy Back", "Why Moles Live Underground", and many more.

== See also ==
- Aetiology
