= Etiology =

Study of causation, or origination

186 The image shows dopaminergic projections in healthy individuals (left) and in Parkinson's disease (right). Red arrows represent inhibition and blue arrows represent stimulation of the target structure.

Etiology (/ˌiːtiˈɒlədʒi/; alternatively spelled aetiology or ætiology) is the study of causation or origination. The word is derived from the Greek word αἰτιολογία (aitiología), meaning "giving a reason for" (from αἰτία (aitía) 'cause' and -λογία (-logía) 'study of'). More completely, etiology is the study of the causes, origins, or reasons behind the way that things are, or the way they function, or it can refer to the causes themselves. The word is commonly used in medicine (pertaining to causes of disease or illness) and in philosophy, but also in physics, biology, psychology, political science, geography, cosmology, spatial analysis and theology in reference to the causes or origins of various phenomena, and even in computer science to reference the causes of bugs or unexpected behaviour.

Throughout history and to the present day, when and where natural or historical facts are not well understood and/or not well documented, myths often arise to provide etiologies, e.g., causal explanations. Thus, an etiological myth, or origin myth, is a myth that functions to explain the origins of some phenomena. For example, Virgil's Aeneid is an etiological myth for the Roman Empire. In theology, many religions have creation myths explaining the origins of the world.

== Medicine ==
In medicine, the etiology of an illness or condition refers to frequent studies to determine one or more factors that come together to cause it. Relatedly, when disease is widespread, epidemiological studies investigate what associated factors, such as location, sex, exposure to chemicals, and many others, make a population more or less likely to have an illness, condition, or disease, thus helping determine its etiology. Sometimes determining etiology is an imprecise process. In the past, the etiology of a common sailor's disease, scurvy, was long unknown. When large, ocean-going ships were built, sailors began to put to sea for long periods of time, and often lacked fresh fruit and vegetables. Without knowing the precise cause, Captain James Cook suspected scurvy was caused by the lack of vegetables in the diet. Based on his suspicion, he forced his crew to eat sauerkraut, a cabbage preparation, every day, and based upon the positive outcomes, he inferred that it prevented scurvy, even though he did not know precisely why. It took about another two hundred years to discover the precise etiology: the lack of vitamin C in a sailor's diet.

The following are examples of intrinsic factors:

- Inherited conditions, or conditions that are passed down from one's parents. An example of this is hemophilia, a disorder that leads to excessive bleeding.
- Metabolic and endocrine, or hormone, disorders. These are abnormalities in the chemical signaling and interaction in the body. For example, Diabetes mellitus is an endocrine disease that causes high blood sugar.
- Neoplastic disorders or cancer where the cells of the body grow out of control.
- Problems with immunity, such as allergies, which are an overreaction of the immune system.

== Mythology ==
An etiological myth, or origin myth, is a myth intended to explain the origins of cult practices, natural phenomena, proper names and the like. For example, the name Delphi and its associated deity, Apollon Delphinios, are explained in the Homeric Hymn which tells of how Apollo, in the shape of a dolphin (delphis), propelled Cretans over the seas to make them his priests. While Delphi is actually related to the word delphus ('womb'), many etiological myths are similarly based on folk etymology (the term Amazon, for example). In the Aeneid (published c. 17 BC), Virgil claims the descent of Augustus Caesar's Julian clan from the hero Aeneas through his son Ascanius, also called Iulus. The story of Prometheus' sacrifice trick at Mecone in Hesiod's Theogony relates how Prometheus tricked Zeus into choosing the bones and fat of the first sacrificial animal rather than the meat to justify why, after a sacrifice, the Greeks offered the bones wrapped in fat to the gods while keeping the meat for themselves. In Ovid's Pyramus and Thisbe, the origin of the color of mulberries is explained, as the white berries become stained red from the blood gushing forth from their double suicide.

== See also ==
- Backstory
- Bradford Hill criteria
- Correlation does not imply causation
- Creation myth
- Just-so story
- Just So Stories
- Pathology
- Pourquoi story
- Problem of causation
- Involution (esoterism)
