= Nourse Theater =

Theatre in San Francisco, California, US

Sydney Goldstein Theater
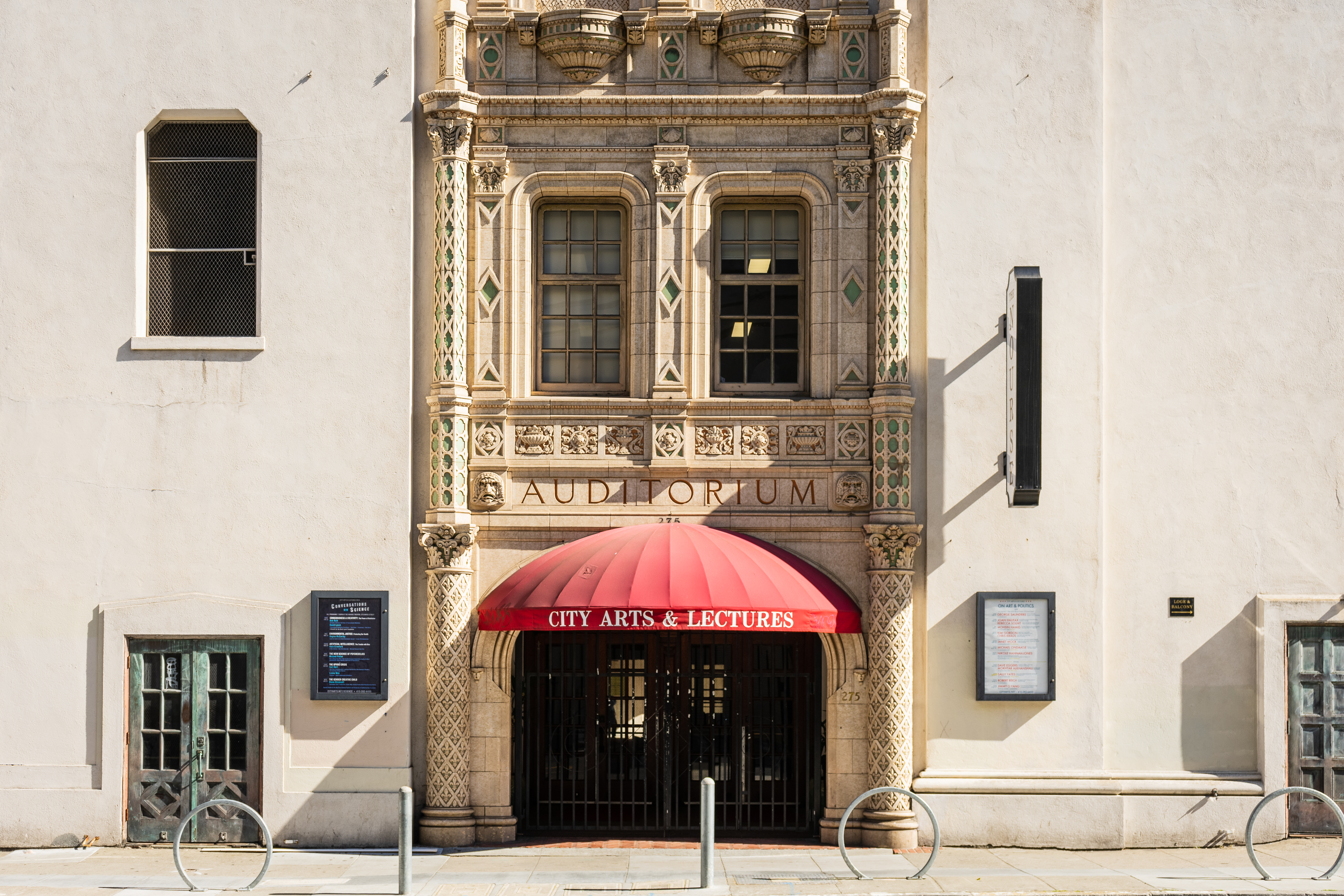
- Interactive map of Sydney Goldstein Theater
- Address: 275 Hayes St
- Location: San Francisco, California
- Coordinates: 37.77705°N 122.42087°W
- Operator: City Arts & Lectures
- Capacity: 1,687
- Type: Auditorium

Construction
- Built: 1926
- Renovated: 2013

Website
- www.cityarts.net/nourse/

The Sydney Goldstein Theater, formerly the Nourse Theater, is a 1,687-seat venue located at 275 Hayes Street, San Francisco, California. It is host to the City Arts & Lectures series as well as podcast tapings and conversations with notable writers and cultural figures.

== History ==
Built in 1926 in the Spanish Revival style as a part of the High School of Commerce, it was used as an auditorium for student events and assemblies until it was closed in 1952. The theater was used intermittently for pageants and live music concerts until 1985 when the auditorium was temporarily converted to a courtroom for a large asbestos exposure case. It was one of the first “wired” courtrooms with computers linked to a mainframe in Texas used to share documents. After the end of the trial, it was no longer used as a public venue, serving only as a storage facility for the San Francisco Unified School District for nearly 30 years.

In 2013, when the Herbst Theatre was closed for repairs, the founder of the City Arts and Lectures program, Sydney Goldstein, renovated the Nourse Theater and made it the new home of the program. In 2018, following Goldstein's death, the theater was renamed in her honor.

== Architectural details ==
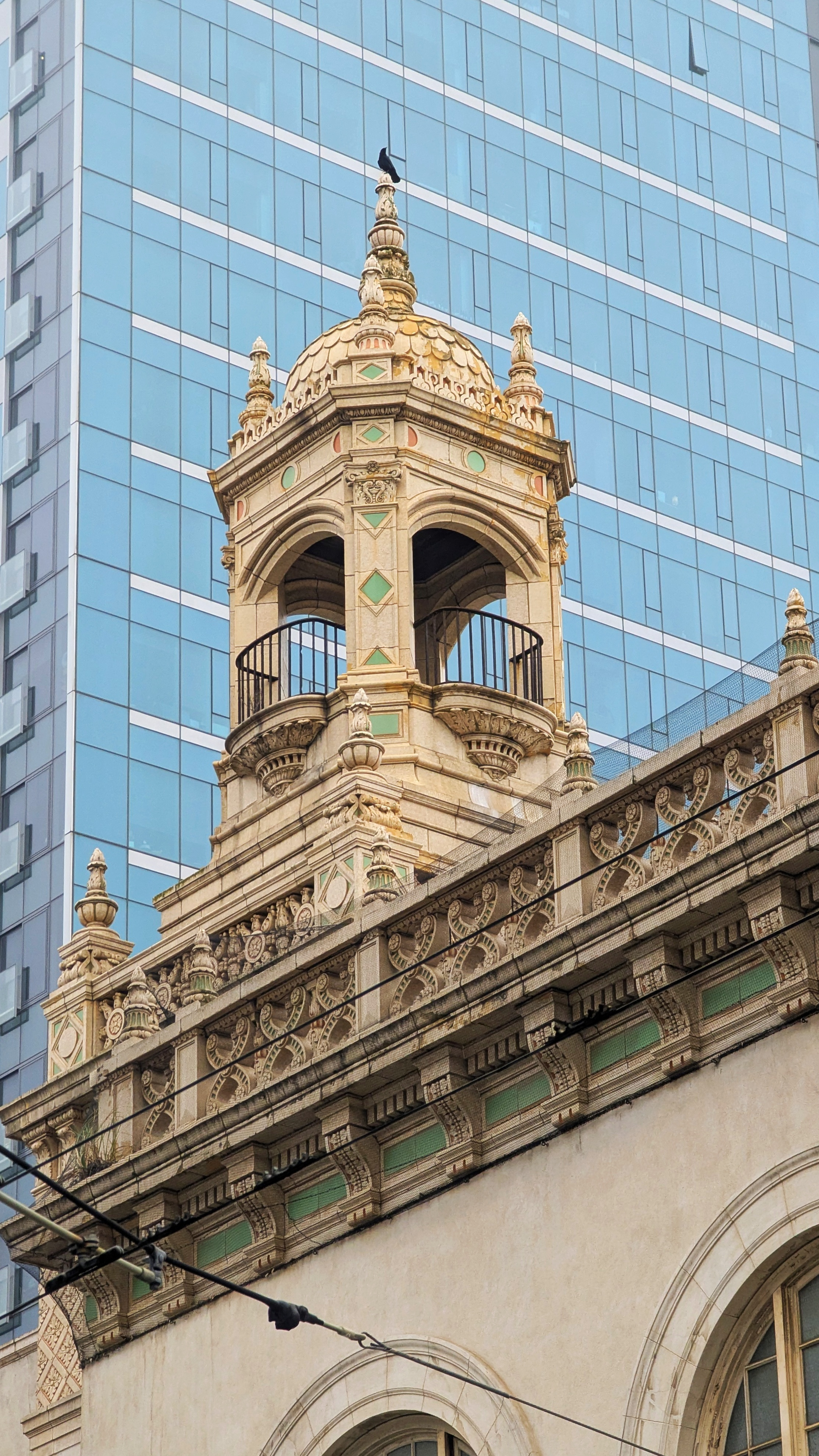
Cupola of the theater

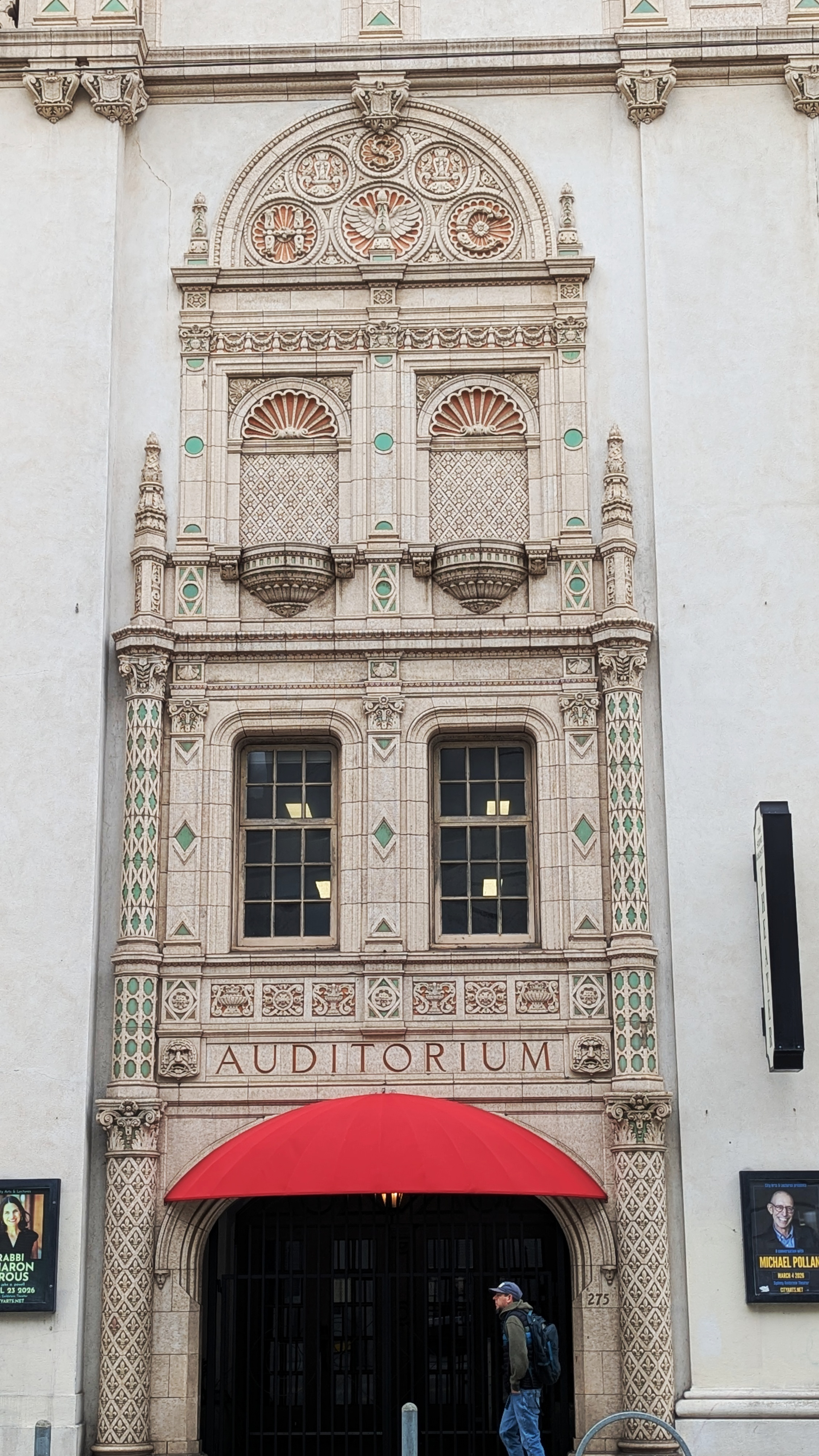
Doorway, in the Spanish revival style

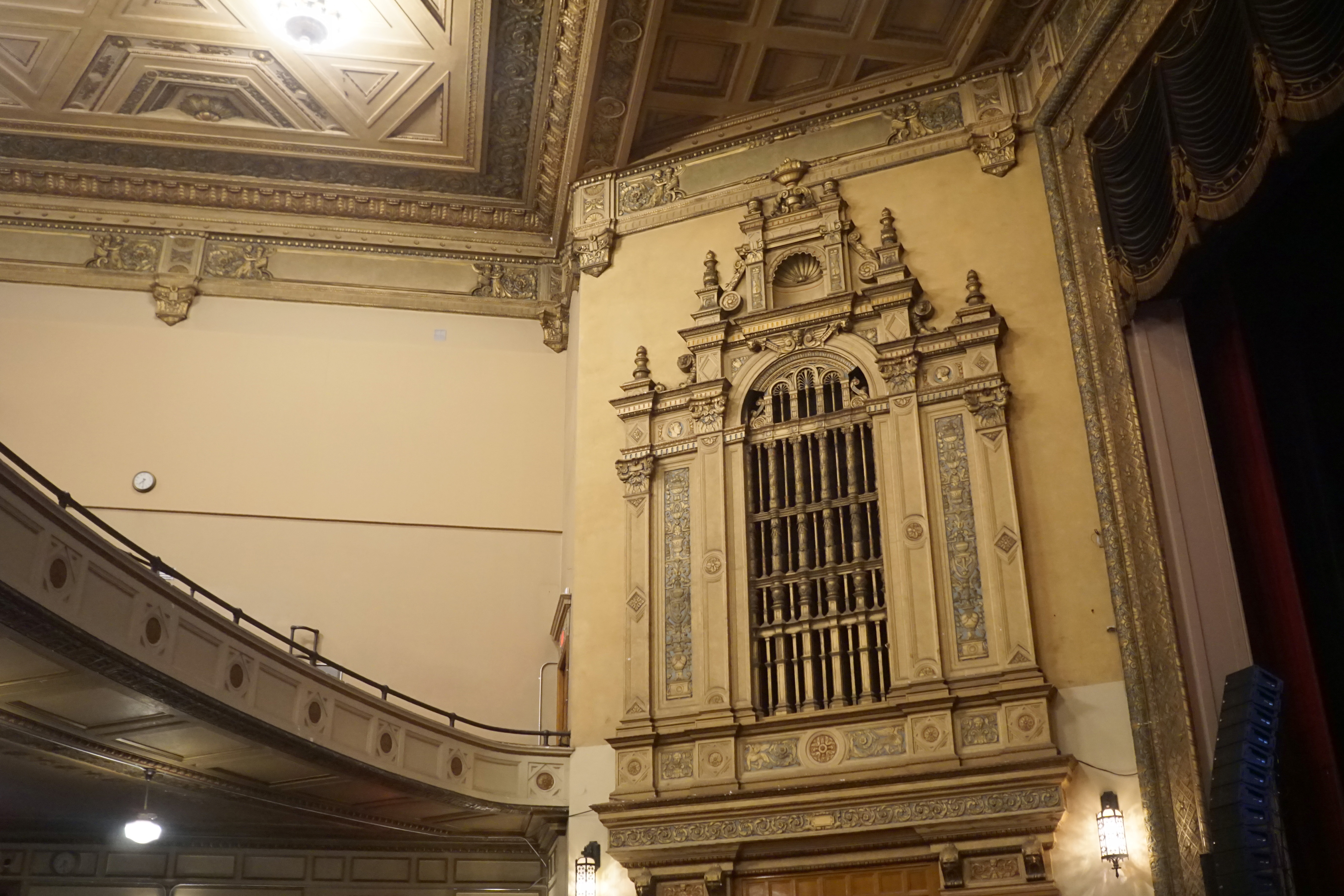
Detail of the interior design
