= Cyamites =

Mythical Greek hero associated with beans

Cyamites or Kyamites (Ancient Greek: Κυαμίτης) from κύαμος "bean", was a hero in ancient Greek religion, worshiped locally in Athens.

His name has been interpreted as "the god of the beans and patron of the bean market", given that a bean market (κυαμῖτις) was reported by Plutarch to have been situated on the same road not far from the sanctuary.

According to Károly Kerényi, it is likely that Cyamites is another name for the god Hades.
