= City Arts & Lectures =

Public radio content creators in San Francisco, California, US

City Arts & Lectures is a San Francisco-based nonprofit that has offered programs with leading figures in arts and ideas since 1980. In a given year, there are roughly fifty lectures and onstage conversations (as well as occasional surprise performances, film tributes, and concerts) with prominent writers, critics, scientists, performing artists, and cultural figures from around the world.

Events are held in the historic Sydney Goldstein (formerly Nourse) Theater, with online access. Programs can be listened to in edited broadcasts on more than 130 public radio stations across the country, co-produced with KQED 88.5 FM in San Francisco, as well as on the dedicated podcast.

The 1,687-seat Nourse Theater was restored in 2013, and is now the main venue for City Arts and Lectures events. It was renamed for its progenitor following her death in 2018.
