= Newsom v. Trump =

2025 United States lawsuit

- Court: United States District Court for the Northern District of California
- Full case name: Gavin Newsom, et al. v. Donald J. Trump, et al.
- Docket nos.: 3:25-cv-04870-CRB; 25-3727

Case history
- Prior action: Motion for temporary restraining order filed June 10, 2025; TRO granted June 12, 2025
- Subsequent action: Stay extended by the United States Court of Appeals for the Ninth Circuit

Questions presented
- Whether the President may federalize and deploy the National Guard to Los Angeles under 10 U.S.C. § 12406

Court membership
- Judge sitting: Charles R. Breyer

Newsom v. Trump (2025) was a lawsuit brought by California seeking relief against the second Trump administration for the administration's federalization and deployment of the California National Guard in response to the June 2025 Los Angeles protests.

The lawsuit was brought in the United States District Court for the Northern District of California on June 9, 2025, at first requesting immediate relief, which was denied by district judge Charles Breyer the next day. On June 12, Breyer ruled against the Trump administration, which promptly appealed to the United States Court of Appeals for the Ninth Circuit, being granted a stay of that ruling. On June 17, an appellate panel of the Ninth Circuit held a hearing for the case. On June 19, the appellate panel of the Ninth Circuit extended the stay granted on June 12.

On September 2, 2025, Breyer ruled that the use of the National Guard violated the Posse Comitatus Act and issued an injunction, staying the injunction until September 12 to allow the government time to appeal. The government appealed on September 3, and the Ninth Circuit granted a stay on September 4. On October 22, 2025, the Ninth Circuit denied rehearing en banc of the decision that President Trump lawfully exercised authority under 10 U.S.C. § 12406, which allowed President Trump to sustain the federalization. On December 10, 2025, Breyer ordered the National Guard deployment in Los Angeles to end, which the Ninth Circuit upheld on December 12 with an order for the federalized National Guard troops to leave the city by noon on December 15 while allowing the federalization to continue.

On December 31, 2025, Trump ended the deployment of National Guard forces in Los Angeles.

== Background ==
=== Protests and response ===
During both his 2016 and 2024 presidential campaigns, Donald Trump pledged to increase federal immigration and nationality law enforcement activity. On November 19, 2024, following the presidential reelection of Trump to a non-consecutive second term, Los Angeles adopted a sanctuary city policy to limit local law enforcement assistance to such federal activity. In May 2025, the Trump administration announced an immigration enforcement strategy focused on workplaces.

On the evening of June 6, 2025, protests began in downtown Los Angeles against workplace raids conducted that day by United States Immigration and Customs Enforcement, alongside other federal law enforcement agencies. Protests "remained peaceful" and continued into the next day, with local authorities declaring an unlawful assembly for a nighttime disturbance near the federal Metropolitan Detention Center. Also that night, President Trump invoked 10 U.S.C. § 12406 to federalize part of the California National Guard to protect federal property and personnel in Los Angeles.

On June 9, 2025 California governor Gavin Newsom sued the Trump administration and sought relief against the federalization of the California National Guard to Los Angeles beginning June 7.

== Litigation history ==
=== District Court ===
The suit was brought on June 9, 2025, in the United States District Court for the Northern District of California, where it was assigned to Charles Breyer, the brother of former United States Supreme Court justice Stephen Breyer. State attorney general Rob Bonta represented California and sought emergency relief. California argued that the Trump administration memorandum concerning the partial federalization of the California National Guard under 10 U.S.C. § 12406 was invalid for not following the proper procedure of issuance through the governor and that even if procedure was followed, the memorandum was issued over a "manufactured crisis." Judge Breyer denied the June 9 request for emergency relief to give the Trump administration time to respond.

The Trump administration argued in response that the proper procedure was followed and that the precise grounds for issuing the memorandum were an unreviewable matter "committed to the President's discretion." In a hearing on June 12, Breyer sharply disagreed with the Trump administration's arguments that the memorandum's issuance was an unreviewable discretionary action or that the memorandum had been properly issued, stating: 'I'm trying to figure out how something can be ‘through’ somebody if, in fact, you didn't give it to him.'" Later that same day, Breyer ruled in favor of California and granted temporary relief, but that ruling was stayed hours later when the Trump administration appealed to the United States Court of Appeals for the Ninth Circuit.

=== Court of Appeals ===
After staying Breyer’s ruling, a three-judge panel of the United States Court of Appeals for the Ninth Circuit, composed of circuit judges Mark J. Bennett, Eric D. Miller, and Jennifer Sung, scheduled an expedited hearing for June 17, considering whether to extend the stay further. In that hearing, California emphasized alleged harm to the state from the federalization of California National Guard members, while the Trump administration reasserted its earlier arguments that the federalization was a discretionary action and not subject to judicial review. On June 19, in a unanimous per curiam decision, the three-judge panel extended the stay, disagreeing with the Trump administration's argument that issuing the memorandum was a discretionary action, and instead held that the standard of review was "highly deferential" and that "it is likely that the President lawfully exercised his statutory authority."

=== District Court ruling ===
After a three-day bench trial, Breyer ruled on September 2, 2025, that the Trump administration had violated the Posse Comitatus Act and ordered the administration not to use National Guard or military troops for civilian law enforcement in California. Breyer issued an injunction covering all of California, blocking the use of the National Guard, though he stayed the injunction until September 12 to give time for the government to appeal. The government appealed on September 3. The U.S. Court of Appeals for the Ninth Circuit granted an administrative stay on September 4.

=== Ninth Circuit Denial of Re-hearing en banc ===
On October 22, 2025, the Ninth Circuit denied rehearing en banc of the June 19 panel decision, with a majority of eligible judges declining to reconsider the three-judge panel's earlier finding that the President likely acted lawfully under 10 U.S.C. § 12406. The decision allowed the Trump administration to retain federal control over California National Guard troops. Ten judges, including Senior Judge Marsha Berzon and Judge Ronald M. Gould, issued statements dissenting from the denial of en banc review.

=== Second District Court ruling ===
On December 10, 2025, Breyer ordered Trump to cease the National Guard deployment in Los Angeles. In addition, Breyer would have issued a preliminary injunction which had been sought by California, but put an official ruling on that matter on hold until December 15, 2025.

=== Ninth Circuit affirmation ===
On October 23, 2026, the Ninth Circuit upheld the Second District Court ruling enjoining the federalization of the National Guard. Judge Bennett dissented on the basis that Newsom's Tenth Amendment claim is unlikely to succeed.

== Aftermath ==
=== Public opinion polling ===
Three national polls conducted between June 10–12 showed divided public opinion on the deployment:

Public opinion on the Los Angeles deployment
Pollster	Field dates	Sample^{†}	Support/Approve	Oppose/Disapprove	Ref.
Reuters/Ipsos	June 11–12, 2025	1,136 (online)	48%	41%	
Washington Post–Schar School	June 10, 2025	1,015 (SMS)	41%	44%	
YouGov/Economist	June 10, 2025	4,309 (online)	34%	47%	

^{†} U.S. adults nationwide; survey methodology in parentheses. Totals may not equal 100% due to undecided respondents and rounding.

The polling data revealed significant differences in opinion based on party affiliation and geography. Republican support for the deployment ranged from 68% to 86% across surveys, while Democratic support remained at 13% or below in all polls. The Reuters/Ipsos survey found that 35% of respondents approved of Trump's handling of the Los Angeles situation, while 50% disapproved.

Regional differences were also apparent in the polling results. The Washington Post–Schar School poll found that California residents opposed the deployment 58%–32%, a larger margin of opposition than recorded nationally. Independent voters showed net opposition to the deployment across the three surveys, with opposition margins of approximately 15 percentage points.

=== End of deployment ===
Trump announced the end of the National Guard Deployment in Los Angeles, as well as in Chicago and Portland, on December 31, 2025.
