= Geocentrism =

Superseded description of the Universe with Earth at the center

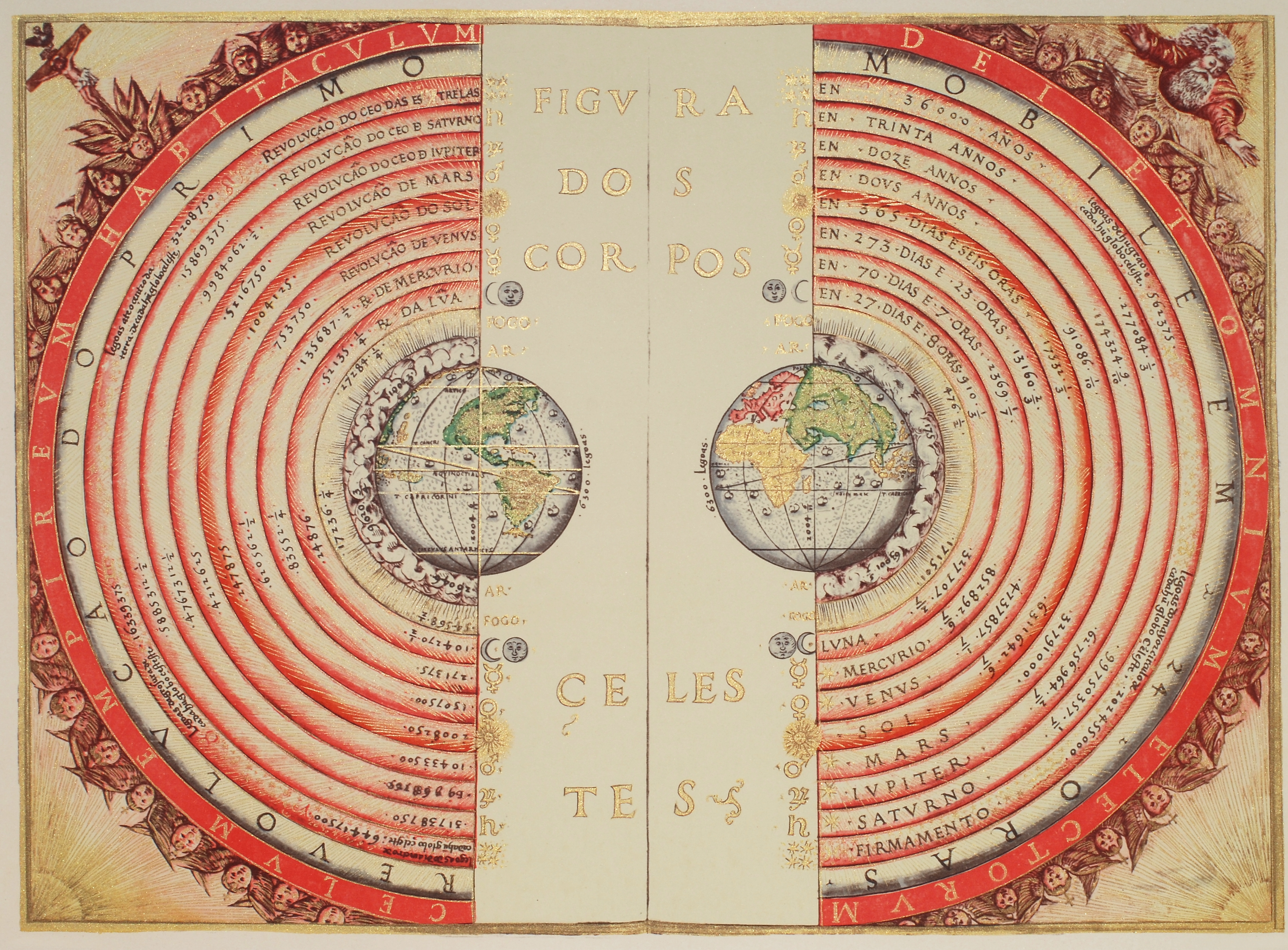
Figure of the heavenly bodies – An illustration of a Ptolemaic geocentric system by Portuguese cosmographer and cartographer Bartolomeu Velho, 1568 (Bibliothèque Nationale, Paris)

Geocentrism is a superseded astronomical model description of the Universe with Earth at the center. It is also known as the geocentric model, often exemplified specifically by the Ptolemaic system. Under most geocentric models, the Sun, the Moon, stars, and planets all orbit Earth. The geocentric model was the predominant description of the cosmos in many European ancient civilizations, such as those of Aristotle in Classical Greece and Ptolemy in Roman Egypt, as well as during the Islamic Golden Age.

Two observations supported the idea that Earth was the center of the Universe. First, from anywhere on Earth, the Sun appears to revolve around Earth once per day. While the Moon and the planets have their own motions, they also appear to revolve around Earth about once per day. The stars appeared to be fixed on a celestial sphere rotating once each day about an axis through the geographical poles of Earth. Second, Earth seems to be unmoving from the perspective of an earthbound observer; it feels solid, stable, and stationary.

Ancient Greek, ancient Roman, and medieval philosophers usually combined the geocentric model with a spherical Earth, in contrast to the older flat-Earth model implied in some mythology. However, the Greek astronomer and mathematician Aristarchus of Samos (c. 310 – c. 230 BC) developed a heliocentric model placing all of the then-known planets in their correct order around the Sun. The ancient Greeks believed that the motions of the planets were circular, a view that was not challenged in Western culture until the 17th century, when Johannes Kepler postulated that orbits were heliocentric and elliptical (Kepler's first law of planetary motion). In 1687, Isaac Newton showed that elliptical orbits could be derived from his laws of gravitation.

The astronomical predictions of the Ptolemaic system, developed in the 2nd century, served as the basis for preparing astrological and astronomical charts for over 1,500 years. The geocentric model held sway into the early modern age, but from the late 16th century onward, it was gradually superseded by the heliocentric model of Copernicus and Kepler. There was much resistance to the transition between these two theories, since for a long time the geocentric postulate produced more accurate results. Additionally some felt that a new, unknown theory could not subvert an accepted consensus for geocentrism.

== Ancient Greece ==
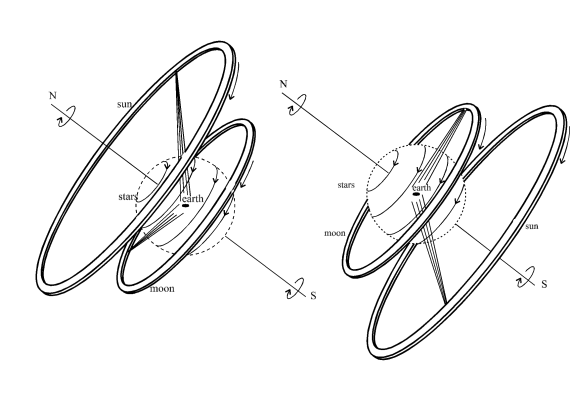
Illustration of Anaximander's models of the universe. On the left, summer; on the right, winter.

In the 6th century BC, Anaximander proposed a cosmology in which Earth is shaped like a section of a pillar (a cylinder), held aloft at the center of everything. The Sun, Moon, and planets were holes in invisible wheels which surround Earth, and through those holes, humans could see concealed fire. At around the same time, Pythagoras thought that Earth was a sphere (in accordance with observations of eclipses), but not at the center; he believed that it was in motion around an unseen fire. Later these two concepts were combined, so that most of the educated Greeks from the 4th century BC onwards thought that Earth was a sphere at the center of the universe.

In the 4th century BC Plato and his student Aristotle, wrote works based on the geocentric model. According to Plato, the Earth was a sphere, stationary at the center of the universe. The stars and planets were carried around the Earth on spheres or circles, arranged in the order (outwards from the center): Moon, Sun, Venus, Mercury, Mars, Jupiter, Saturn, fixed stars, with the fixed stars located on the celestial sphere. In his "Myth of Er", a section of the Republic, Plato describes the cosmos as the Spindle of Necessity, attended by the Sirens and turned by the three Fates. Eudoxus of Cnidus, who worked with Plato, developed a less mythical, more mathematical explanation of the planets' motion based on Plato's dictum stating that all phenomena in the heavens can be explained with uniform circular motion. Aristotle elaborated on Eudoxus' system.

In the fully developed Aristotelian system, the spherical Earth is at the center of the universe, and all other heavenly bodies are attached to 47–55 transparent, rotating spheres surrounding the Earth, all concentric with it. (The number is so high because several spheres are needed for each planet.) These spheres, known as crystalline spheres, all moved at different uniform speeds to create the revolution of bodies around the Earth. They were composed of an incorruptible substance called aether. Aristotle believed that the Moon was in the innermost sphere and therefore touches the realm of Earth, causing the dark spots (maculae) and the ability to go through lunar phases. He further described his system by explaining the natural tendencies of the terrestrial elements: earth, water, fire, air, as well as celestial aether. His system held that earth was the heaviest element, with the strongest movement towards the center, thus water formed a layer surrounding the sphere of Earth. The tendency of air and fire, on the other hand, was to move upwards, away from the center, with fire being lighter than air. Beyond the layer of fire, were the solid spheres of aether in which the celestial bodies were embedded. They were also entirely composed of aether.

Adherence to the geocentric model stemmed largely from several important observations. If the Earth moved, then the apparent angular separations between stars would be expected to change due to a shifted viewpoint. The shapes of the constellations should then change over the course of a year. Since the constellations appeared constant in shape throughout the year, ancient astronomers concluded that either the stars were extremely distant or the Earth was stationary. The Greeks chose the simpler of the two explanations. Stellar parallax was not detected until the 19th century.

Another observation used in favor of the geocentric model at the time was the apparent consistency of Venus' luminosity, which implies that it is usually about the same distance from Earth, which in turn is more consistent with geocentrism than heliocentrism. (In fact, Venus' luminous consistency is due to any loss of light caused by its phases being compensated for by an increase in apparent size caused by its varying distance from Earth.) Objectors to heliocentrism noted that terrestrial bodies naturally tend to come to rest as near as possible to the center of the Earth. Further, barring the opportunity to fall closer the center, terrestrial bodies tend not to move unless forced by an outside object, or transformed to a different element by heat or moisture.

Atmospheric explanations for many phenomena were preferred because the Eudoxan–Aristotelian model based on perfectly concentric spheres was not intended to explain changes in the brightness of the planets due to a change in distance. Eventually, perfectly concentric spheres were abandoned as it was impossible to develop a sufficiently accurate model under that ideal, with the mathematical methods then available. However, while providing for similar explanations, the later deferent and epicycle model was already flexible enough to accommodate observations.

== Ancient India ==
Before the Kerala astronomers around 1500, Indian astronomy was focused on predicting solar and planetary motions rather than as a model of the cosmos. The earlier astronomers developed two different approaches, one for the Sun and inner planets, Mercury and Venus, and one for the outer planets, Mars, Jupiter, and Saturn. The systems was broadly similar to the Ptolemaic system but more accurate in calculating the planet's latitude. By 1500 Nilakantha Somayaji developed a single approach for all of the planets. Among the ancient Indian astronomers Aryabhata argued for rotation of the Earth, but his system was otherwise geocentric.

== Ptolemaic model ==
The basic elements of Ptolemaic astronomy, showing a planet on an epicycle with an eccentric deferent and an equant point. The Green shaded area is the celestial sphere which the planet occupies.

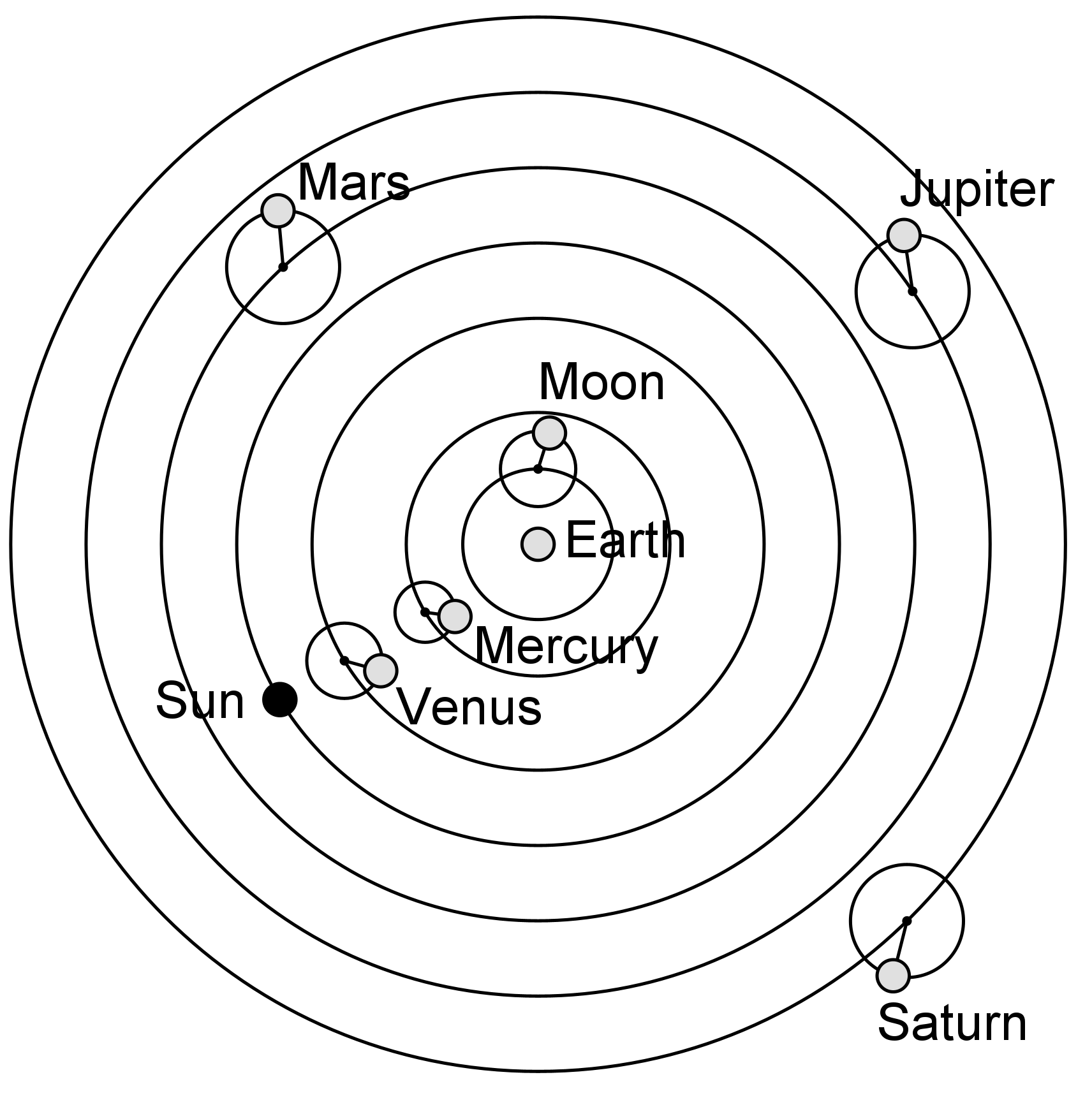
The Ptolemaic geocentric planetary model showing the epicycles of the planets and the Moon

Although the basic tenets of Greek geocentrism were established by the time of Aristotle, the details of his system did not become standard. The Ptolemaic system, written down by the Hellenistic astronomer Claudius Ptolemaeus in the 2nd century AD, finally standardized geocentrism. The key work describing the system only survives via an Arabic translation of a book named Planetary Hypothesis. For over a millennium, European and Islamic astronomers assumed it was the correct cosmological model. Because of its influence, people sometimes wrongly think the Ptolemaic system is identical with the geocentric model.

Ptolemy argued that the Earth was a sphere in the center of the universe, from the simple observation that half the stars were above the horizon and half were below the horizon at any time (stars on rotating stellar sphere), and the assumption that the stars were all at some modest distance from the center of the universe. If the Earth were substantially displaced from the center, this division into visible and invisible stars would not be equal. (Note: This argument is given in Book I, Chapter 5, of the Almagest.)

In the Ptolemaic system, each planet is moved by a system of two spheres: one called its deferent; the other, its epicycle. The deferent is a circle whose center point, called the eccentric and marked in the diagram with an X, is distant from the Earth. The original purpose of the eccentric was to account for the difference in length of the seasons (northern autumn was about five days shorter than spring during this time period) by placing the Earth away from the center of rotation of the rest of the universe. Another sphere, the epicycle, is embedded inside the deferent sphere and is represented by the smaller dotted line to the right. A given planet then moves around the epicycle at the same time the epicycle moves along the path marked by the deferent. These combined movements cause the given planet to move closer to and further away from the Earth at different points in its orbit, and explained the observation that planets slowed down, stopped, and moved backward in retrograde motion, and then again reversed to resume normal, or prograde, motion.

The deferent-and-epicycle model had been used by Greek astronomers for centuries along with the idea of the eccentric (a deferent whose center is slightly away from the Earth), which was even older. In the illustration, the center of the deferent is not the Earth but the spot marked X, making it eccentric (from the Greek ἐκ ec- meaning "from" and κέντρον kentron meaning "center"), from which the spot takes its name. Unfortunately, the system that was available in Ptolemy's time did not quite match observations, even though it was an improvement over Hipparchus' system.

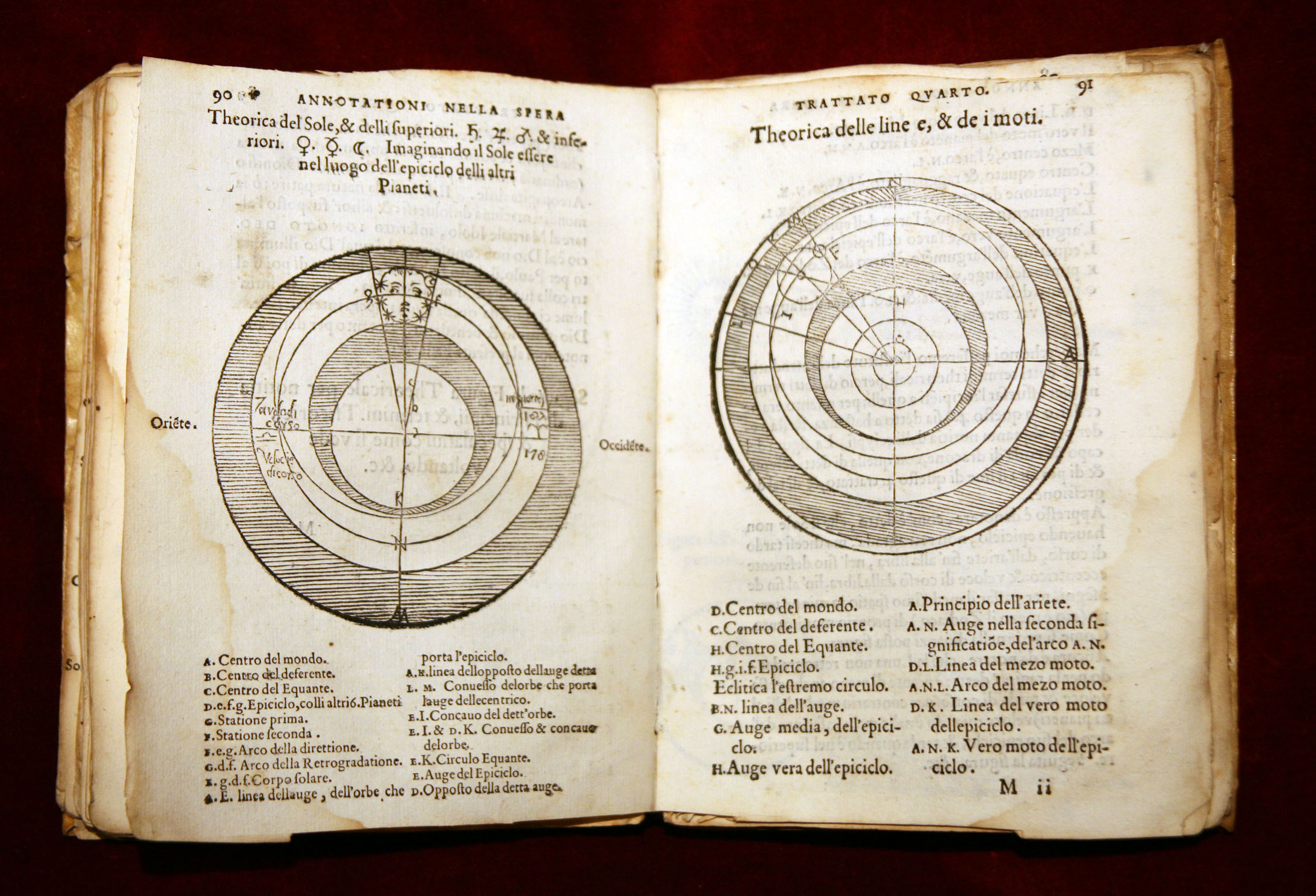
Pages from 1550 Annotazione on Sacrobosco's De sphaera mundi, showing the Ptolemaic system.

Most noticeably the size of a planet's retrograde loop (especially that of Mars) would be smaller, or sometimes larger, than expected, resulting in positional errors of as much as 30 degrees. To alleviate the problem, Ptolemy developed the equant. The equant was a point near the center of a planet's orbit where, if you were to stand there and watch, the center of the planet's epicycle would always appear to move at uniform speed; all other locations would see non-uniform speed, as on the Earth. By using an equant, Ptolemy claimed to keep motion which was uniform and circular, although it departed from the Platonic ideal of uniform circular motion. The resultant system, which eventually came to be widely accepted in the west, seems unwieldy to modern astronomers; each planet required an epicycle revolving on a deferent, offset by an equant which was different for each planet. It predicted various celestial motions, including the beginning and end of retrograde motion, to within a maximum error of 10 degrees, considerably better than without the equant.

The model with epicycles is in fact a relatively accurate model of an elliptical orbit with low eccentricity. The ellipse shape does not appear to a noticeable extent when the eccentricity is less than 5%, but the offset distance of the "center", or the focus occupied by the Sun, is very noticeable even with low eccentricities as possessed by the planets.

== Persian and Arab astronomy and geocentrism ==
After the Graeco-Arabic translation movement that included the translation of the Almagest from Greek to Arabic, Muslims adopted and refined the geocentric model of Ptolemy, which they believed correlated with the teachings of Islam. Muslim astronomers generally accepted the Ptolemaic system and the geocentric model, but by the 10th century, texts appeared regularly whose subject matter expressed doubts concerning Ptolemy (shukūk). Several Muslim scholars questioned Earth's apparent immobility and centrality within the universe. Some Muslim astronomers believed that Earth rotates around its axis, such as Abu Sa'id al-Sijzi (d. c. 1020). According to al-Biruni, Sijzi invented an astrolabe called al-zūraqī, based upon a belief held by some of his contemporaries "that the motion we see is due to the Earth's movement and not to that of the sky". The prevalence of this belief is further confirmed by a reference from the 13th century that states:

According to the geometers [or engineers] (muhandisīn), the Earth is in constant circular motion, and what appears to be the motion of the heavens is actually due to the motion of the Earth and not the stars.

Early in the 11th century, Alhazen wrote a scathing critique of Ptolemy's model in his Doubts on Ptolemy (c. 1028), which some have interpreted to imply he was criticizing Ptolemy's geocentrism, but most agree that he was actually criticizing the details of Ptolemy's model rather than his geocentrism.

In the 12th century, Arzachel departed from the ancient Greek idea of uniform circular motions by hypothesizing that the planet Mercury moves in an elliptic orbit, while Alpetragius proposed a planetary model that abandoned the equant, epicycle and eccentric mechanisms, though this resulted in a system that was mathematically less accurate. His alternative system spread through most of Europe during the 13th century.

Fakhr al-Din al-Razi (1149–1209), in dealing with his conception of physics and the physical world in his Matalib, rejects the Aristotelian and Avicennian notion of the Earth's centrality within the universe, but instead argues that there are "a thousand thousand worlds (alfa alfi 'awalim) beyond this world, such that each one of those worlds be bigger and more massive than this world, as well as having the like of what this world has." To support his theological argument, he cites the Qur'anic verse, "All praise belongs to God, Lord of the Worlds", emphasizing the term "Worlds".

The "Maragha Revolution" refers to the Maragha school's revolution against Ptolemaic astronomy. The "Maragha school" was an astronomical tradition beginning in the Maragha observatory and continuing with astronomers from the Damascus mosque and Samarkand observatory. Like their Andalusian predecessors, the Maragha astronomers attempted to solve the equant problem (the circle around whose circumference a planet or the center of an epicycle was conceived to move uniformly) and produce alternative configurations to the Ptolemaic model without abandoning geocentrism. They were more successful than their Andalusian predecessors in producing non-Ptolemaic configurations which eliminated the equant and eccentrics, were more accurate than the Ptolemaic model in numerically predicting planetary positions, and were in better agreement with empirical observations. The most important of the Maragha astronomers included Mo'ayyeduddin Urdi (d. 1266), Nasīr al-Dīn al-Tūsī (1201–1274), Qutb al-Din al-Shirazi (1236–1311), Ibn al-Shatir (1304–1375), Ali Qushji (c. 1474), Al-Birjandi (d. 1525), and Shams al-Din al-Khafri (d. 1550).

However, the Maragha school never made the paradigm shift to heliocentrism. The influence of the Maragha school on Copernicus remains speculative, since there is no documentary evidence to prove it. The possibility that Copernicus independently developed the Tusi couple remains open, since no researcher has yet demonstrated that he knew about Tusi's work or that of the Maragha school.

== Ptolemaic and rival systems ==
Not all Greeks agreed with the geocentric model. The Pythagorean system has already been mentioned; some Pythagoreans believed the Earth to be one of several planets going around a central fire. Hicetas and Ecphantus, two Pythagoreans of the 5th century BC, and Heraclides Ponticus in the 4th century BC, believed that the Earth rotated on its axis but remained at the center of the universe. Such a system still qualifies as geocentric. It was revived in the Middle Ages by Jean Buridan. Heraclides Ponticus was once thought to have proposed that both Venus and Mercury went around the Sun rather than the Earth, but it is now known that he did not. Martianus Capella definitely put Mercury and Venus in orbit around the Sun. Aristarchus of Samos wrote a work, which has not survived, on heliocentrism, saying that the Sun was at the center of the universe, while the Earth and other planets revolved around it. His theory was not popular, and he had one named follower, Seleucus of Seleucia. Epicurus was the most radical. He correctly realized in the 4th century BC that the universe does not have any single center. This theory was widely accepted by the later Epicureans and was notably defended by Lucretius in his poem De rerum natura.

=== Copernican system ===
In 1543, the geocentric system met its first serious challenge with the publication of Copernicus' De revolutionibus orbium coelestium (On the Revolutions of the Heavenly Spheres), which posited that the Earth and the other planets instead revolved around the Sun. The geocentric system was still held for many years afterwards, as at the time the Copernican system did not offer better predictions than the geocentric system, and it posed problems for both natural philosophy and scripture. The Copernican system was no more accurate than Ptolemy's system, because it still used circular orbits. This was not altered until Johannes Kepler postulated that they were elliptical (Kepler's first law of planetary motion).

=== Tychonic system ===
In this depiction of the Tychonic system, the objects on blue orbits (the Moon and the Sun) revolve around the Earth. The objects on orange orbits (Mercury, Venus, Mars, Jupiter, and Saturn) revolve around the Sun. Around all is a sphere of stars, which rotates.

Tycho Brahe (1545–1601) made more accurate determinations of the positions of planets and stars. He sought the effect of stellar parallax, which would have been empirically verifiable proof of the Earth's motion around the Sun predicted by the Copernican model. Having observed no effect, he rejected the idea of the Earth's motion.

Consequently, he introduced a new system, the Tychonic system, in which the Earth was still at the center of the universe, and around it revolved the Sun, but all the other planets revolved around the Sun in a set of epicycles. His model considered both the benefits of the Copernican model and the lack of evidence for the Earth's motion.

=== Observation by Galileo and abandonment of the Ptolemaic model ===
With the invention of the telescope in 1609, observations made by Galileo Galilei (such as that Jupiter has moons) called into question some of the tenets of geocentrism but did not seriously threaten it. Because he observed dark "spots" on the Moon, craters, he remarked that the moon was not a perfect celestial body as had been previously conceived. This was the first detailed observation by telescope of the Moon's imperfections, which had previously been explained by Aristotle as the Moon being contaminated by Earth and its heavier elements, in contrast to the aether of the higher spheres. Galileo could also see the moons of Jupiter, which he dedicated to Cosimo II de' Medici, and stated that they orbited around Jupiter, not Earth. This was a significant claim as it would mean not only that not everything revolved around Earth as stated in the Ptolemaic model, but also showed a secondary celestial body could orbit a moving celestial body, strengthening the heliocentric argument that a moving Earth could retain the Moon. Galileo's observations were verified by other astronomers of the time period who quickly adopted use of the telescope, including Christoph Scheiner, Johannes Kepler, and Giovan Paulo Lembo.

In 1610 Galileo Galilei observed with his telescope that Venus showed phases, despite remaining near the Sun in Earth's sky (first image). This proved that it orbits the Sun and not Earth, as predicted by Copernican and Tychonic models, and disproved the Ptolemaic one (second image).

In December 1610, Galileo Galilei used his telescope to observe that Venus showed all phases, just like the Moon. He thought that while this observation was incompatible with the Ptolemaic system, it was a natural consequence of the heliocentric system.

However, Ptolemy placed Venus' deferent and epicycle entirely inside the sphere of the Sun (between the Sun and Mercury), but this was arbitrary; he could just as easily have swapped Venus and Mercury and put them on the other side of the Sun, or made any other arrangement of Venus and Mercury, as long as they were always near a line running from the Earth through the Sun, such as placing the center of the Venus epicycle near the Sun. In this case, if the Sun is the source of all the light, under the Ptolemaic system:

If Venus is between Earth and the Sun, the phase of Venus must always be crescent or all dark. If Venus is beyond the Sun, the phase of Venus must always be gibbous or full.

But Galileo saw Venus at first small and full, and later large and crescent. This showed that with a Ptolemaic cosmology, the Venus epicycle can be neither completely inside nor completely outside of the orbit of the Sun. As a result, Ptolemaics abandoned the idea that the epicycle of Venus was completely inside the Sun, and later 17th-century competition between astronomical cosmologies focused on variations of the Tychonic or Copernican systems.

=== Historical positions of the Roman Catholic hierarchy ===
The Galileo affair pitted the geocentric model against the claims of Galileo. In regards to the theological basis for such an argument, two Popes addressed the question of whether the use of phenomenological language would compel one to admit an error in Scripture. Both taught that it would not. Pope Leo XIII wrote:

we have to contend against those who, making an evil use of physical science, minutely scrutinize the Sacred Book in order to detect the writers in a mistake, and to take occasion to vilify its contents. ... There can never, indeed, be any real discrepancy between the theologian and the physicist, as long as each confines himself within his own lines, and both are careful, as St. Augustine warns us, "not to make rash assertions, or to assert what is not known as known". If dissension should arise between them, here is the rule also laid down by St. Augustine, for the theologian: "Whatever they can really demonstrate to be true of physical nature, we must show to be capable of reconciliation with our Scriptures; and whatever they assert in their treatises which is contrary to these Scriptures of ours, that is to Catholic faith, we must either prove it as well as we can to be entirely false, or at all events we must, without the smallest hesitation, believe it to be so." To understand how just is the rule here formulated we must remember, first, that the sacred writers, or to speak more accurately, the Holy Ghost "Who spoke by them, did not intend to teach men these things (that is to say, the essential nature of the things of the visible universe), things in no way profitable unto salvation." Hence they did not seek to penetrate the secrets of nature, but rather described and dealt with things in more or less figurative language, or in terms which were commonly used at the time, and which in many instances are in daily use at this day, even by the most eminent men of science. Ordinary speech primarily and properly describes what comes under the senses; and somewhat in the same way the sacred writers-as the Angelic Doctor also reminds us – "went by what sensibly appeared", or put down what God, speaking to men, signified, in the way men could understand and were accustomed to.

— Providentissimus Deus 18

Maurice Finocchiaro, author of a book on the Galileo affair, notes that this is "a view of the relationship between biblical interpretation and scientific investigation that corresponds to the one advanced by Galileo in the "Letter to the Grand Duchess Christina". Pope Pius XII repeated his predecessor's teaching:

The first and greatest care of Leo XIII was to set forth the teaching on the truth of the Sacred Books and to defend it from attack. Hence with grave words did he proclaim that there is no error whatsoever if the sacred writer, speaking of things of the physical order "went by what sensibly appeared" as the Angelic Doctor says, speaking either "in figurative language, or in terms which were commonly used at the time, and which in many instances are in daily use at this day, even among the most eminent men of science". For "the sacred writers, or to speak more accurately – the words are St. Augustine's – the Holy Spirit, Who spoke by them, did not intend to teach men these things – that is the essential nature of the things of the universe – things in no way profitable to salvation"; which principle "will apply to cognate sciences, and especially to history", that is, by refuting, "in a somewhat similar way the fallacies of the adversaries and defending the historical truth of Sacred Scripture from their attacks".

— Divino afflante Spiritu, 3

In 1664, Pope Alexander VII republished the Index Librorum Prohibitorum (List of Prohibited Books) and attached the various decrees connected with those books, including those concerned with heliocentrism. He stated in a papal bull that his purpose in doing so was that "the succession of things done from the beginning might be made known [quo rei ab initio gestae series innotescat]".

The position of the curia evolved slowly over the centuries towards permitting the heliocentric view. In 1757, during the papacy of Benedict XIV, the Congregation of the Index withdrew the decree that prohibited all books teaching the Earth's motion, although the Dialogue and a few other books continued to be explicitly included. In 1820, the Congregation of the Holy Office, with the pope's approval, decreed that Catholic astronomer Giuseppe Settele was allowed to treat the Earth's motion as an established fact and removed any obstacle for Catholics to hold to the motion of the Earth:

The Assessor of the Holy Office has referred the request of Giuseppe Settele, Professor of Optics and Astronomy at La Sapienza University, regarding permission to publish his work Elements of Astronomy in which he espouses the common opinion of the astronomers of our time regarding the Earth’s daily and yearly motions, to His Holiness through Divine Providence, Pope Pius VII. Previously, His Holiness had referred this request to the Supreme Sacred Congregation and concurrently to the consideration of the Most Eminent and Most Reverend General Cardinal Inquisitor. His Holiness has decreed that no obstacles exist for those who sustain Copernicus' affirmation regarding the Earth's movement in the manner in which it is affirmed today, even by Catholic authors. He has, moreover, suggested the insertion of several notations into this work, aimed at demonstrating that the above mentioned affirmation [of Copernicus], as it has come to be understood, does not present any difficulties; difficulties that existed in times past, prior to the subsequent astronomical observations that have now occurred. [Pope Pius VII] has also recommended that the implementation [of these decisions] be given to the Cardinal Secretary of the Supreme Sacred Congregation and Master of the Sacred Apostolic Palace. He is now appointed the task of bringing to an end any concerns and criticisms regarding the printing of this book, and, at the same time, ensuring that in the future, regarding the publication of such works, permission is sought from the Cardinal Vicar whose signature will not be given without the authorization of the Superior of his Order.

In 1822, the Congregation of the Holy Office removed the prohibition on the publication of books treating of the Earth's motion in accordance with modern astronomy and Pope Pius VII ratified the decision:

The most excellent [cardinals] have decreed that there must be no denial, by the present or by future Masters of the Sacred Apostolic Palace, of permission to print and to publish works which treat of the mobility of the Earth and of the immobility of the sun, according to the common opinion of modern astronomers, as long as there are no other contrary indications, on the basis of the decrees of the Sacred Congregation of the Index of 1757 and of this Supreme [Holy Office] of 1820; and that those who would show themselves to be reluctant or would disobey, should be forced under punishments at the choice of [this] Sacred Congregation, with derogation of [their] claimed privileges, where necessary.

The 1835 edition of the Catholic List of Prohibited Books for the first time omits the Dialogue from the list. In his 1921 papal encyclical, In praeclara summorum, Pope Benedict XV stated that, "though this Earth on which we live may not be the center of the universe as at one time was thought, it was the scene of the original happiness of our first ancestors, witness of their unhappy fall, as too of the Redemption of mankind through the Passion and Death of Jesus Christ". In 1965 the Second Vatican Council stated that, "Consequently, we cannot but deplore certain habits of mind, which are sometimes found too among Christians, which do not sufficiently attend to the rightful independence of science and which, from the arguments and controversies they spark, lead many minds to conclude that faith and science are mutually opposed." The footnote on this statement is to Msgr. Pio Paschini's, Vita e opere di Galileo Galilei, 2 volumes, Vatican Press (1964). Pope John Paul II regretted the treatment that Galileo received, in a speech to the Pontifical Academy of Sciences in 1992. The Pope declared the incident to be based on a "tragic mutual miscomprehension". He further stated:

Cardinal Poupard has also reminded us that the sentence of 1633 was not irreformable, and that the debate which had not ceased to evolve thereafter, was closed in 1820 with the imprimatur given to the work of Canon Settele. ... The error of the theologians of the time, when they maintained the centrality of the Earth, was to think that our understanding of the physical world's structure was, in some way, imposed by the literal sense of Sacred Scripture. Let us recall the celebrated saying attributed to Baronius "Spiritui Sancto mentem fuisse nos docere quomodo ad coelum eatur, non quomodo coelum gradiatur". In fact, the Bible does not concern itself with the details of the physical world, the understanding of which is the competence of human experience and reasoning. There exist two realms of knowledge, one which has its source in Revelation and one which reason can discover by its own power. To the latter belong especially the experimental sciences and philosophy. The distinction between the two realms of knowledge ought not to be understood as opposition.

== Gravitation ==
Johannes Kepler analysed Tycho Brahe's famously accurate observations, and afterwards constructed his three laws in 1609 and 1619, based upon a heliocentric model wherein the planets move in elliptical paths. Using these laws, he was the first astronomer to successfully predict a transit of Venus for the year 1631. The change from circular orbits to elliptical planetary paths dramatically improved the accuracy of celestial observations and predictions. Because the heliocentric model devised by Copernicus was no more accurate than Ptolemy's system, new observations were needed to persuade those who still adhered to the geocentric model. However, Kepler's laws based upon Brahe's data became a problem that geocentrists could not easily overcome.

In 1687, Isaac Newton stated the law of universal gravitation, which was described earlier as a hypothesis by Robert Hooke and others. His main achievement was to mathematically derive Kepler's laws of planetary motion from the law of gravitation, thus helping to prove the latter. This introduced gravitation as the force which kept Earth and the planets moving through the universe, and also kept the atmosphere from flying away. The theory of gravity allowed scientists to rapidly construct a plausible heliocentric model for the Solar System. In his Principia, Newton explained his theory of how gravity, previously thought to be a mysterious, unexplained occult force, directed the movements of celestial bodies, and kept the Solar System in working order. His descriptions of centripetal force were a breakthrough in scientific thought, using the newly developed mathematical discipline of differential calculus, finally replacing the previous schools of scientific thought, which had been dominated by Aristotle and Ptolemy. However, the process was gradual.

Several empirical tests of Newton's theory, explaining the longer period of oscillation of a pendulum at the equator and the differing size of a degree of latitude, would gradually become available between 1673 and 1738. In addition, stellar aberration was observed by Robert Hooke in 1674, and tested in a series of observations by Jean Picard over a period of ten years, finishing in 1680. However, it was not explained until 1729, when James Bradley provided an approximate explanation in terms of the Earth's revolution about the Sun.

In 1838, astronomer Friedrich Wilhelm Bessel measured the parallax of the star 61 Cygni successfully, and disproved Ptolemy's claim that parallax motion did not exist. This finally confirmed the assumptions made by Copernicus, providing accurate, dependable scientific observations, and conclusively displaying how distant stars are from Earth.

A geocentric frame is useful for many everyday activities and most laboratory experiments, but is a less appropriate choice for Solar System mechanics and space travel. While a heliocentric frame is most useful in those cases, galactic and extragalactic astronomy is easier if the Sun is treated as neither stationary nor the center of the universe, but rather rotating around the center of the Milky Way Galaxy, while in turn the Milky Way is also not at rest in the cosmic background.

== Relativity ==
Albert Einstein and Leopold Infeld wrote in The Evolution of Physics (1938): "Can we formulate physical laws so that they are valid for all CS [coordinate systems], not only those moving uniformly, but also those moving quite arbitrarily, relative to each other? If this can be done, our difficulties will be over. We shall then be able to apply the laws of nature to any CS. The struggle, so violent in the early days of science, between the views of Ptolemy and Copernicus would then be quite meaningless. Either CS could be used with equal justification. The two sentences, 'the sun is at rest and the Earth moves', or 'the sun moves and the Earth is at rest', would simply mean two different conventions concerning two different CS. Could we build a real relativistic physics valid in all CS; a physics in which there would be no place for absolute, but only for relative, motion? This is indeed possible!"

Despite giving more respectability to the geocentric view than Newtonian physics does, relativity is not geocentric. Rather, relativity states that the Sun, the Earth, the Moon, Jupiter, or any other point for that matter could be chosen as a center of the Solar System with equal validity.

Relativity agrees with Newtonian predictions that regardless of whether the Sun or the Earth are chosen arbitrarily as the center of the coordinate system describing the Solar System, the paths of the planets form (roughly) ellipses with respect to the Sun, not the Earth. With respect to the average reference frame of the fixed stars, the planets do indeed move around the Sun, which due to its much larger mass, moves far less than its own diameter and the gravity of which is dominant in determining the orbits of the planets (in other words, the center of mass of the Solar System is near the center of the Sun). The Earth and Moon are much closer to being a binary planet; the center of mass around which they both rotate is still inside the Earth, but is about 4,624 km (2,873 miles) or 72.6% of the Earth's radius away from the center of the Earth (thus closer to the surface than the center).

What the principle of relativity points out is that correct mathematical calculations can be made regardless of the reference frame chosen, and these will all agree with each other as to the predictions of actual motions of bodies with respect to each other. It is not necessary to choose the object in the Solar System with the largest gravitational field as the center of the coordinate system in order to predict the motions of planetary bodies, though doing so may make calculations easier to perform or interpret. A geocentric coordinate system can be more convenient when dealing only with bodies mostly influenced by the gravity of the Earth (such as artificial satellites and the Moon), or when calculating what the sky will look like when viewed from Earth (as opposed to an imaginary observer looking down on the entire Solar System, where a different coordinate system might be more convenient).

== Religious and contemporary adherence to geocentrism ==
The Ptolemaic model held sway into the early modern age; from the late 16th century onward it was gradually replaced as the consensus description by the heliocentric model. Geocentrism as a separate religious belief, however, never completely died out. In the United States between 1870 and 1920, for example, various members of the Lutheran Church–Missouri Synod published articles disparaging Copernican astronomy and promoting geocentrism. However, in the 1902 Theological Quarterly, A. L. Graebner observed that the synod had no doctrinal position on geocentrism, heliocentrism, or any scientific model, unless it were to contradict Scripture. He stated that any possible declarations of geocentrists within the synod did not set the position of the church body as a whole.

Articles arguing that geocentrism was the biblical perspective appeared in some early creation science newsletters. Contemporary advocates for such religious beliefs include Robert Sungenis (author of the 2006 book Galileo Was Wrong and the 2014 pseudo-documentary film The Principle). Most contemporary creationist organizations reject such perspectives. (Note: Donald B. DeYoung, for example, states that "Similar terminology is often used today when we speak of the sun's rising and setting, even though the earth, not the sun, is doing the moving. Bible writers used the 'language of appearance', just as people always have. Without it, the intended message would be awkward at best and probably not understood clearly. When the Bible touches on scientific subjects, it is entirely accurate.") A few Orthodox Jewish leaders maintain a geocentric model of the universe and an interpretation of Maimonides to the effect that he ruled that the Earth is orbited by the Sun. The Lubavitcher Rebbe also explained that geocentrism is defensible based on the theory of relativity. While geocentrism is important in Maimonides' calendar calculations, the great majority of Jewish religious scholars, who accept the divinity of the Bible and accept many of his rulings as legally binding, do not believe that the Bible or Maimonides command a belief in geocentrism. There have been some modern Islamic scholars who promoted geocentrism. One of them was Ahmed Raza Khan Barelvi, a Sunni scholar of the Indian subcontinent. He rejected the heliocentric model and wrote a book that explains the movement of the sun, moon and other planets around the Earth.

According to a report released in 2014 by the National Science Foundation, 26% of Americans surveyed believe that the Sun revolves around the Earth. Morris Berman quotes a 2006 survey that show currently some 20% of the U.S. population believe that the Sun goes around the Earth (geocentricism) rather than the Earth goes around the Sun (heliocentricism), while a further 9% claimed not to know. Polls conducted by Gallup in the 1990s found that 16% of Germans, 18% of Americans and 19% of Britons hold that the Sun revolves around the Earth. A study conducted in 2005 by Jon D. Miller of Northwestern University, an expert in the public understanding of science and technology, found that about 20%, or one in five, of American adults believe that the Sun orbits the Earth. According to 2011 VTSIOM poll, 32% of Russians believe that the Sun orbits the Earth.

== Planetariums ==
Many planetariums can switch between heliocentric and geocentric models. In particular, the geocentric model is still used for projecting the celestial sphere and lunar phases in education.

== Ephemerides ==
Ephemerides (tables of positions) of the sun, which are needed for astronomical and navigational purposes, assume geocentricity for ease of calculation.

== See also ==
- Aristotelian physics
- Earth-centered, Earth-fixed coordinate system
- History of the center of the Universe
- Hollow Earth § Concave Hollow Earths
- Religious cosmology
- Sphere of fire
- Wolfgang Smith, Catholic mathematician

== Bibliography ==
- Crowe, Michael J. (1990). Theories of the World from Antiquity to the Copernican Revolution. Mineola, NY: Dover Publications. ISBN 0486261735.
- Dreyer, J.L.E. (1953). A History of Astronomy from Thales to Kepler. New York: Dover Publications.
- Evans, James (1998). The History and Practice of Ancient Astronomy. New York: Oxford University Press.
- Graney, Christopher M. (2015). Setting Aside All Authority: Giovanni Battista Riccioli and the Science against Copernicus in the Age of Galileo. Notre Dame, IN: U. of Notre Dame Press. ISBN 978-0-268-02988-3.
- Grant, Edward (1984-01-01). "In Defense of the Earth's Centrality and Immobility: Scholastic Reaction to Copernicanism in the Seventeenth Century". Transactions of the American Philosophical Society. New Series. 74 (4): 1–69. doi:10.2307/1006444. ISSN 0065-9746. JSTOR 1006444.
- Heath, Thomas (1913). Aristarchus of Samos. Oxford: Clarendon Press.
- Hoyle, Fred (1973). Nicolaus Copernicus.
- Koestler, Arthur (1986) [1959]. The Sleepwalkers: A History of Man's Changing Vision of the Universe. Penguin Books. ISBN 014055212X. 1990 reprint: ISBN 0140192468.
- Kuhn, Thomas S. (1957). The Copernican Revolution (PDF). Cambridge: Harvard University Press. ISBN 0674171039. OCLC 1241666716.
- Linton, Christopher M. (2004). From Eudoxus to Einstein—A History of Mathematical Astronomy. Cambridge: Cambridge University Press. ISBN 9780521827508.
- Qadir, Asghar (1989). Relativity: An introduction to the special theory. Singapore Teaneck, NJ: World Scientific. ISBN 9971-5-0612-2. OCLC 841809663.
- Walker, Christopher, ed. (1996). Astronomy Before the Telescope. London: British Museum Press. ISBN 0714117463.
- Wright, J. Edward (2000). The Early History Of Heaven. Oxford University Press. Google Books
