= Chamaeleon (philosopher) =

Greek Peripatetic philosopher (c.350–c.275 BC)

Chamaeleon (or Chameleon; Ancient Greek: Χαμαιλέων; c. 350 – c. 275 BC), was a Peripatetic philosopher from Heraclea Pontica. He was one of the immediate disciples of Aristotle and wrote on several of the ancient Greek poets, namely:

- περὶ Ἀνακρέοντος - On Anacreon
- περὶ Σαπφοῦς - On Sappho
- περὶ Σιμωνίδου - On Simonides
- περὶ Θεσπίδος - On Thespis
- περὶ Αἰσχύλου - On Aeschylus
- περὶ Λάσου - On Lasus
- περὶ Πινδάρου - On Pindar
- περὶ Στησιχόρου - On Stesichorus

He also wrote on the Iliad and on Comedy (περὶ κωμῳδίας). In this latter work he discussed, among other subjects, of the dances of comedy. This work is quoted by Athenaeus by the title On Ancient Comedy (περὶ τῆς ἀρχαίας κωμῳδίας), which is also the title of a work by the Peripatetic philosopher Eumelus. Diogenes Laërtius says that Chamaeleon accused Heraclides Ponticus of having stolen from his work concerning Homer and Hesiod. These works were probably both biographical and critical. He also wrote works entitled On Gods (περὶ θεῶν), and On Satyrs (περὶ σατύρων), and some moral treatises, An Exhortation (προτρεπικόν), and On Drunkenness (περι μέθης). His work On Pleasure (περι ἡδονῆς) has also been ascribed to Theophrastus. Only a few fragments of his writing is preserved by Athenaeus and other ancient writers.
