= Polyphrasmon =

5th-century BC Greek tragic playwright

Polyphrasmon (Ancient Greek: Πολυφράσμων, gen.: Πολυφράσμονος) was a Greek tragic playwright. He won the City Dionysia for tragedy in or about 471 BC, and came in third place in 467 BC for a tragic trilogy based on the story of Lycurgus (Lykourgeia); the names of the individual plays in the trilogy are not known, and Aeschylus took first prize in the competition that year. No fragments of Polyphrasmon's plays have survived.

Polyphrasmon was the son of tragic poet Phrynichus, and was named after his grandfather.
