= Dionysius the Renegade =

Ancient Greek philosopher

Dionysius the Renegade (Ancient Greek: Διονύσιος ὁ Μεταθέμενος; c. 330 BC – c. 250 BC), also known as Dionysius of Heraclea, was a Stoic philosopher and pupil of Zeno of Citium who, late in life, abandoned Stoicism when he became afflicted by terrible pain.

== Life ==
He was the son of Theophantus. In early life he was a disciple of Heraclides Ponticus, Alexinus, and Menedemus, and afterwards of Zeno, who appears to have induced him to adopt Stoicism. At a later time he was afflicted with terrible eye pain, which caused him to abandon Stoic philosophy, and to join the Cyrenaics, whose doctrine, that hedonism and the absence of pain was the highest good, had more charms for him than the austere ethics of Stoicism. This renunciation of his former philosophical creed drew upon him the nickname of The Renegade (Greek: μεταθέμενος, romanized: Metathemenos). During the time that he was a Stoic, he was praised for his modesty, abstinence, and moderation, but afterwards he was described as a person greatly given to sensual pleasures. He died, in his eightieth year, of voluntary starvation.

According to Diogenes Laërtius Dionysius forged a Sophoclean play titled Parthenopaeus, seemingly for the sole purpose of fooling another philosopher, Heraclides Ponticus. Heraclides was indeed fooled and cited the work as genuine, whereupon Dionysius confessed his forgery. Heraclides refused to believe him, and as proof Dionysius pointed to an acrostic hidden within the play, which gave the name of Pancalus, Dionysius' lover. Unconvinced, Heraclides dismissed this as coincidence; in response, Dionysius instructed Heraclides to read further, which revealed the lines: 'An old monkey is not caught by a trap. Oh yes, he's caught at last, but it takes time' and finally, 'Heraclides is ignorant of letters and not ashamed of his ignorance'.

== Writings ==
Diogenes Laërtius mentions a series of works of Dionysius, all of which are lost:

- Περὶ ἀπαθείας – On Apathy, in two books.
- Περὶ ἀσκήσεως – On Training, in two books.
- Περὶ ἡδονῆς – On Pleasure, in four books.
- Περὶ πλούτου καὶ χάριτος καὶ τιμωρίας – On Riches, and Favours, and Revenge.
- Περὶ ἀνθρώπων χρήσεως – On the Use of Men.
- Περὶ εὐτυχίας – On Good Fortune.
- Περὶ ἀρχαίων βασιλέων – On Ancient Kings.
- Περὶ τῶν ἐπαινουμένων – On Things which are Praised.
- Περὶ βαρβαρικῶν ἐθῶν – On Barbarian Customs.
