= Thespian =

Thespian may refer to:

- A citizen of the Ancient Greek city of Thespiae
- An actor or actress
  - Thespis, the first credited actor
- A person working in drama
- A member of the International Thespian Society, an honor society that promotes excellence in high school theater
- "The Thespian", the sixth song of The Emptiness, the third studio album by American band Alesana

== See also ==
- Thespian grass mouse, a rodent species
