= Phrynichus (tragic poet) =

Late 6th/early 5th century BC Athenian playwright

Phrynichus (/ˈfrɪnɪkəs/; Ancient Greek: Φρύνιχος), son of Polyphradmon and pupil of Thespis, was one of the earliest of the Greek tragedians. Some ancients regarded him as the real founder of tragedy. Phrynichus is said to have died in Sicily. His son Polyphrasmon was also a playwright.

Phrynichus wrote two out of the three known Greek tragedies that dealt with contemporary history from episodes from the Persian Wars (no longer extant).

== Works ==
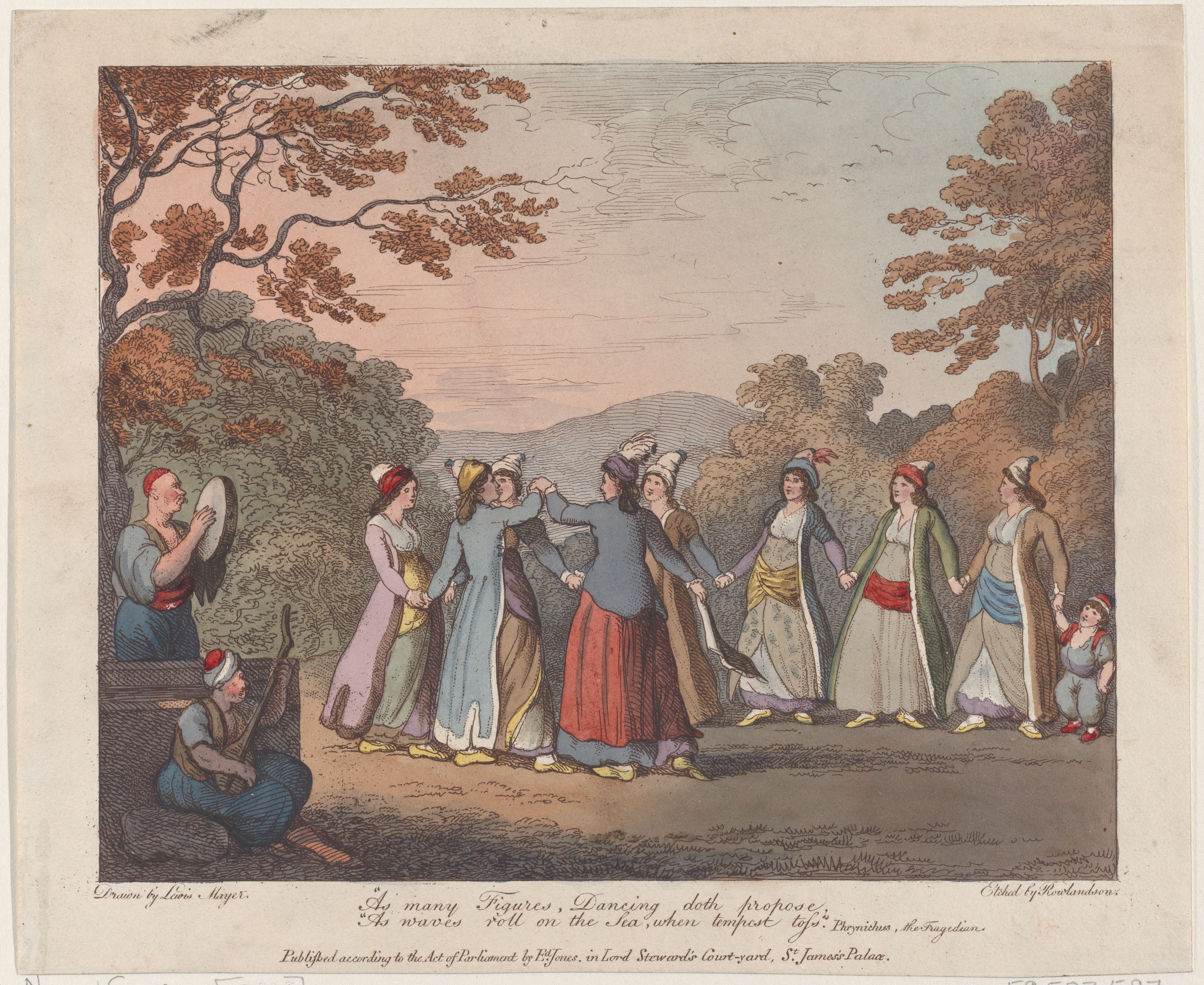
Hand-colored etching by Thomas Rowlandson, with translated text of Phrynichus As many Figures, Dancing doth propose, As waves roll on the Sea, when tempest toss. (Metropolitan Museum of Art)

He gained his first victory in a drama contest in 511 BC. His famous play, the Capture of Miletus or the Sack of Miletus, was probably composed shortly after the conquest of that city by the Persians during the Ionian Revolt. Miletus was a colony of Athens and therefore traditionally held especially dear to the mother city. The audience was moved to tears by Phrynichus's tragedy, with the poet being fined "ὡς ὑπομνήσας οἰκεῖα κακά", "for reminding familiar misfortunes". As a result, the play was banned from being performed again.

In 476 BC, Phrynichus was successful with the Phoenissae, called after the Phoenician women who formed the chorus. This drama celebrated the defeat of Xerxes I at the Battle of Salamis four years earlier. Themistocles provided the funds as choregos (producer), and one of the objectives of the play was to remind the Athenians of his great deeds. The Persians of Aeschylus (472 BC) was modeled after the Phoenissae.

The titles of his other known plays (Actaeon, Alcestis, Antaeus, Daughters of Danaus, Egyptians, Pleuroniai, and Tantalus) show that he dealt with mythological as well as contemporary subjects. He introduced a separate actor, as distinct from the leader of the chorus, and thus laid the foundation for theatrical dialogue. But in his plays, as in the early tragedies generally, the dramatic element was subordinate to the lyric element as represented by the chorus and the dance. According to the Suda, Phrynichus first introduced female characters on the stage (played by men in masks), and made special use of the trochaic tetrameter.

== Recognition ==
Aelian (Claudius Aelianus), in his Varia Historia (3.8), says that Phrynichus's martial verses so stirred the people of Athens, they made him a general.

Fragments of his work exist in Johann August Nauck's Tragicorum graecorum fragmenta (1887), pp 720–725.

== See also ==
- Theatre of ancient Greece
