= Hicetas =

4th-century BC Greek philosopher

Hicetas (Ancient Greek: Ἱκέτας or Ἱκέτης; c. 400 – c. 335 BC) was a Greek philosopher of the Pythagorean School. He was born in Syracuse, Magna Graecia. Like his fellow Pythagorean Ecphantus and the academic Heraclides Ponticus, he believed that the daily movement of permanent stars was caused by the rotation of the Earth around its axis. When Nicolaus Copernicus referred to Nicetus Syracusanus (Nicetus of Syracuse) in De revolutionibus orbium coelestium (1543) as having been cited by Cicero as an ancient who also argued that the Earth moved, it is believed that he was actually referring to Hicetas. Copernicus, searching for ancient views on earth motion, said that he "first ... found in Cicero that Hicetas supposed the earth to move."

Cicero refers to Hicetas in the Academica, volume II, citing in turn Theophrastus. According to Heath:

Cicero [says] “Hicetas of Syracuse, as Theophrastus says, holds that the heaven, the sun, the moon, the stars and in fact all things in the sky remain still, and nothing else in the universe moves, except the earth; but as the earth turns and twists about its axis with extreme swiftness, all the same results follow as if the earth were still and the heaven moved". This is of course not well expressed ... but Cicero means no more than that the rotation of the earth is a complete substitute for the apparent daily rotation of the heaven as a whole.
