= Thespis =

6th-century BCE Greek actor

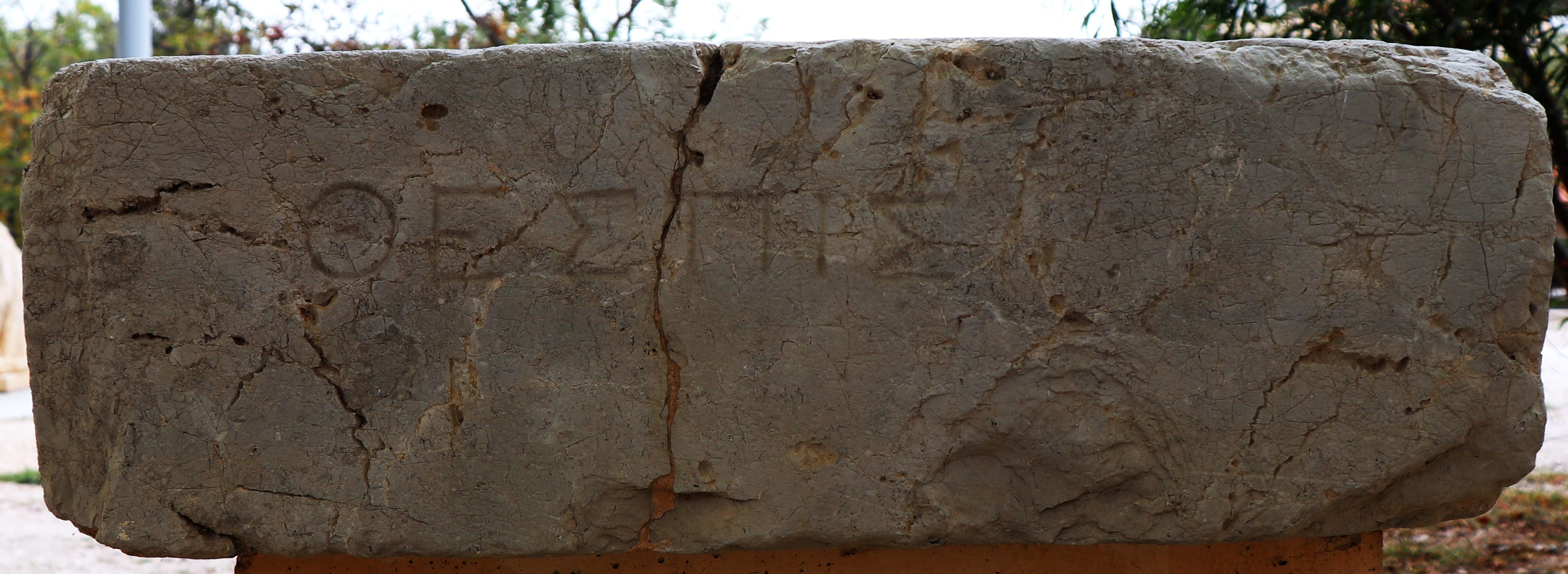
Base for a statue of Thespis in the Theatre of Dionysus, 2nd century BC.

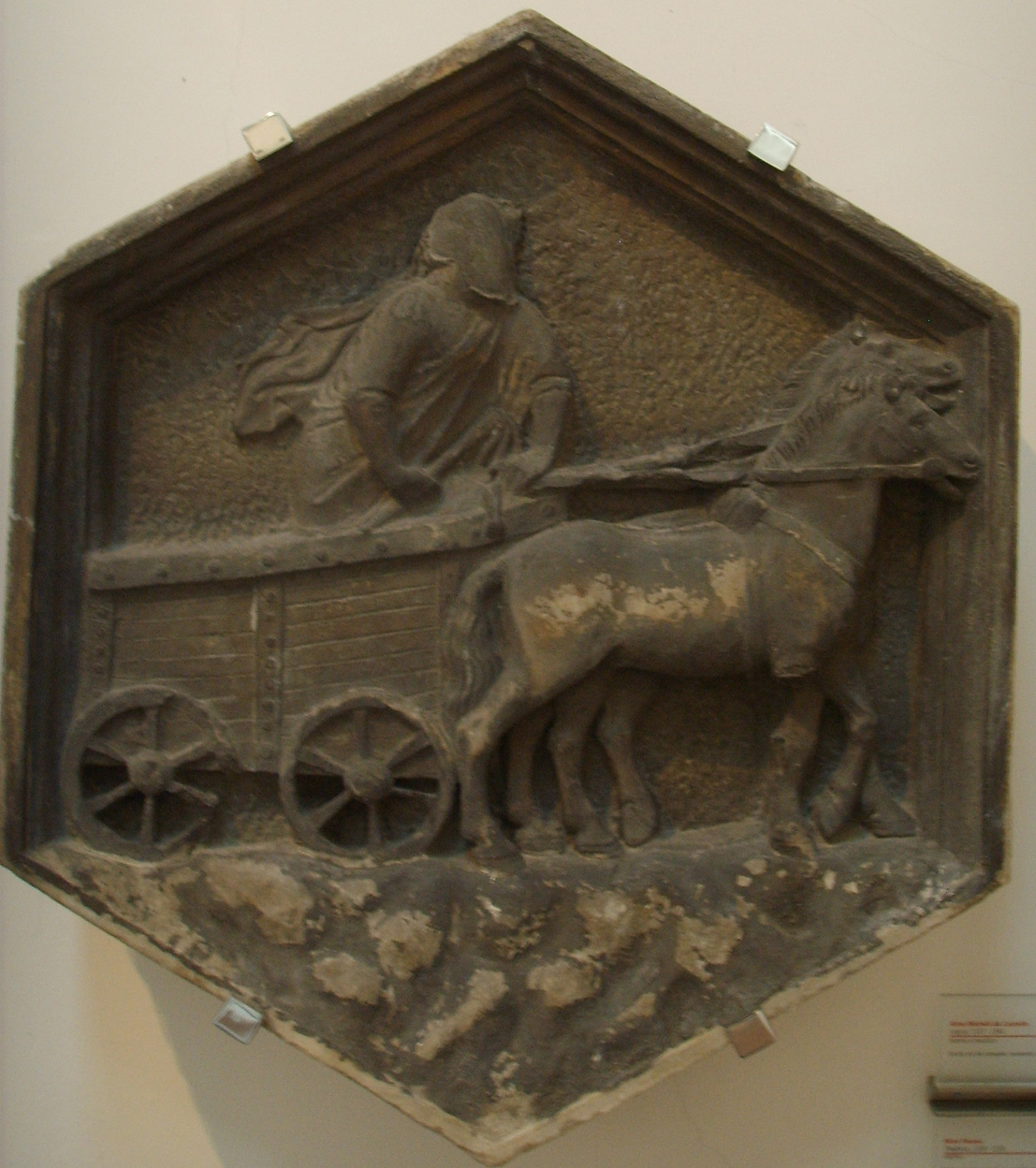
Thespis' wagon, relief of the Giotto's Belltower in Florence, Italy, Nino Pisano, 1334–1336

Thespis (/ˈθɛspɪs/; Ancient Greek: Θέσπις; fl. 6th century BC) was an Athenian tragic poet and actor. He was born in the ancient city of Icarius (present-day Dionysos, Greece). According to certain Ancient Greek sources and especially Aristotle, he was the first person in Ancient Greece to be an actor playing a character in a play, instead of orating as oneself. In other sources, he is said to have pioneered the first principal actor and chorus in theater. He is often called the "Inventor of Tragedy". His name is the etymological origin of the word "thespian", meaning actor.

Thespis was a singer of dithyrambs, songs about stories from mythology with choric refrains. He is credited with introducing a new style in which one singer or actor performed the words of individual characters in the stories, distinguishing between the characters with the aid of different masks. He is credited with inventing theatrical masks, made mostly out of linen.

This new style was called tragedy, and Thespis was the most popular exponent of it. Eventually, in 534 BC competitions to find the best tragedy were instituted at the City Dionysia in Athens, and Thespis won the first documented competition. Capitalising on his success, Thespis also invented theatrical touring; he would tour various cities while carrying his costumes, masks and other props in a horse-drawn wagon.

== Works ==
None of the works of Thespis have verifiably survived, including in fragmentary form. Titles of four individual plays have been attributed to him since initial instances of him being named in literature. In generally following the suggestion of Diogenes Laërtius, modern scholars consider them to be forgeries. Most are believed to be by the philosopher Heraclides Ponticus, with another produced later in the Common Era.

- Contest of Pelias and Phorbas
- Hiereis (Priests)
- Hemitheoi (Demigods)
- Pentheus

Fragments, likely spurious in origin as well, appear in Johann August Nauck's Tragicorum graecorum fragmenta (1887).

== Legacy ==
The invention of acting in the Western world has been accredited to Thespis, with the impression that prior to his performances and works, no one had ever assumed the resemblance of another person for the purpose of storytelling. In homage to Thespis, actors in the English-speaking part of the world have occasionally been referred to as thespians.

Thespis was the title character in an 1871 comic opera by W.S. Gilbert and Arthur Sullivan, the first collaboration between the two men, although the musical score has mostly been lost. The story involves Thespis and his troupe of actors temporarily replacing the gods of Olympus, while the latter come down to earth to "mingle" with humanity. The actors fail at their imitations, and the gods return angrily to resume their rightful roles.

A branch of the National Theatre of Greece expressly instituted in 1939 to tour the country is named "The Wagon of Thespis" (Greek: Άρμα Θέσπιδος, Árma Théspidos) in his honour.

The Thespis Theatre Company, which is part of Brimar Entertainment Limited, is named after the actor Thespis and founded by actor Neil Alan Bell. The company logo is a depiction of Thespis, his horse and cart.

== See also ==
- Aeschylus
- Aristophanes
- Aristotle
- Dionysia
- Euripides
- International Thespian Society
- Phrynichus
- Solon
- Sophocles
- Thespian (disambiguation)

== Sources ==
- Gaster, Theodor, H., Thespis: Ritual, Myth, and Drama in the Ancient Near East, Henry Schuman Publishing, New York, 1950. ISBN 0-87752-188-3.
