= Heraclides Ponticus =

Greek philosopher and astronomer (c. 390–c. 310 BC)

Heraclides Ponticus (Ancient Greek: Ἡρακλείδης ὁ Ποντικός Herakleides; c. 390 BC – c. 310 BC) was a Greek philosopher and astronomer who was born in Heraclea Pontica, now Karadeniz Ereğli, Turkey, and migrated to Athens. He is best remembered for proposing that the Earth rotates on its axis, from west to east, once every 24 hours. He is also hailed as the originator of the heliocentric theory, although this is disputed.

== Life ==
Heraclides' father was Euthyphron, a wealthy nobleman who sent his son to study at the Platonic Academy in Athens under its founder Plato and under his successor Speusippus. According to the Suda, Plato, on his departure for Sicily in 361/360 BC, left the Academy in the charge of Heraclides. Heraclides was nearly elected successor to Speusippus as head of the academy in 339/338 BC, but narrowly lost to Xenocrates. A punning on his name, by Athenian wits, dubbing him Heraclides "Pompicus," suggests he may have been a rather vain and pompous man and the target of much ridicule.

== Works ==
All of Heraclides' writings have been lost; only a few fragments remain. Like the Pythagoreans Hicetas and Ecphantus, Heraclides proposed that the apparent daily motion of the stars was created by the rotation of the Earth on its axis once a day. This view contradicted the accepted Aristotelian model of the universe, which said that the Earth was fixed and that the stars and planets in their respective spheres might also be fixed. Simplicius of Cilicia says that Heraclides proposed that the irregular movements of the planets can be explained if the Earth moves while the Sun stays still.

Although some historians have proposed that Heraclides taught that Venus and Mercury revolve around the Sun, a detailed investigation of the sources has shown that "nowhere in the ancient literature mentioning Heraclides of Pontus is there a clear reference for his support for any kind of heliocentrical planetary position."

Diogenes Laërtius, citing Aristoxenus as his source, states that Heraclides forged plays under the name of Thespis, and further states that Chamaeleon claimed that Heraclides had plagiarised commentaries on Hesiod and Homer from him. Laërtius also conveys a story in which Dionysius the Renegade fooled Heraclides by forging a play, Parthenopaeus, under the name of Sophocles. Heraclides was deceived by this easily and cited it as the work of Sophocles. However, Heraclides seems to have been a versatile and prolific writer on philosophy, mathematics, music, grammar, physics, history and rhetoric, notwithstanding doubts about attribution of many of the works. It appears that he composed various works in dialogue form.

Heraclides also seems to have had an interest in the occult. In particular he focused on explaining trances, visions and prophecies in terms of the retribution of the gods, and reincarnation.

A quote of Heraclides, of particular significance to historians, is his statement that fourth century B.C. Rome was a Greek city that had been captured by Hyperboreans, typically understood as a reference to the Gallic sack of the city.

Heraclides Ponticus refers with much admiration that Pythagoras would remember having been Pirro and before Euphorbus and before some other mortal.
