= Jon D. Miller =

- Occupations: Political scientist, political psychologist, academic and author

Academic background
- Education: A.B., Government; M.A., Political Science; PhD, Political Science
- Alma mater: Ohio University; University of Chicago; Northwestern University

Jon D. Miller (born December 9, 1941) is an American political scientist, political psychologist, academic, and author. He is a research scientist emeritus at the Institute for Social Research at the University of Michigan and the School of Education. He also serves as the director of the Longitudinal Study of American Life and the International Center for the Advancement of Scientific Literacy at the Institute for Social Research at the University of Michigan.

Miller is best known for his analysis of the public understanding of science and technology. Among his authored works are publications in academic journals, including Science, Daedalus, Public Understanding of Science, Space Policy, and Longitudinal and Life Course Studies as well as books such as The American People and Science Policy: The Role of Public Attitudes in the Policy Process and Public Perceptions of Science and Technology: A Comparative Study of the European Union, the United States, Japan, and Canada.

Miller is a Fellow of the American Association for the Advancement of Science.

== Education ==
Miller graduated from Ohio University in 1963 with a B.A. in Government, earned a M.S. from the University of Chicago in 1965 in political science, and graduated from Northwestern University in 1970 with his PhD in political science.

== Career ==
Miller began his academic career in 1970 by joining the Chicago State University, where he served as Director of Research Services and as an assistant professor of political science from 1970 to 1974. Miller was appointed Associate Dean of the Graduate School (Research) and as a professor of political science at Northern Illinois University from 1974 to 1999. Following this, he held an appointment as a professor in the Department of Cell and Molecular Biology and Preventive Medicine at Feinberg School of Medicine at Northwestern University between 1999 and 2006. Between 2006 and 2010, he served as the John A. Hannah Professor of Integrative Studies at Michigan University. He is a research scientist emeritus at the Social Research and the School of Education at the University of Michigan.

From 1991 to 2000, he assumed the roles of vice president at the Chicago Academy of Sciences and Director of the International Center for the Advancement of Scientific Literacy at the Northern Illinois University. Between 1999 and 2006, he held an appointment as director of the Center of Biomedical Communication in the Feinberg School of Medicine at Northwestern University. He serves as the director of the Longitudinal Study of American Life and the International Center for the Advancement of Scientific Literacy at the Institute for Social Research at the University of Michigan.

== Research ==
Miller pioneered the definition and measurement of scientific literacy. He has published four books, 32 chapters in collected works, 54 articles in refereed journals, and 35 research reports. He served as the principal investigator of research initiatives, including a National Aeronautics and Space Administration cooperative agreement to explore the potential for enhancing scientific literacy and lifelong through a just-in-time dissemination process. He has authored numerous publications spanning the areas of civic scientific literacy and just-in-time information acquisition systems including books and articles in peer-reviewed journals.

=== Works ===
Miller's book The American People and Science Policy: The Role of Public Attitudes in the Policy Process assessed the structure and effectiveness of public involvement in shaping science policy within the United States. The book also presented a structured approach to crafting public policies. In his book titled Public Perceptions of Science and Technology: A Comparative Study of the European Union, the United States, Japan, and Canada, he performed the a systematic analysis of how the public perceives and understands science in Europe, Japan, the United States, and Canada, concentrating on creating indicators to investigate the connection between interest in scientific matters, comprehension of scientific concepts, and attitudes toward science and technology. Furthermore, his book Biomedical Communications: Purpose, Audience, and Strategies underscored the importance of researchers, journalists, and policymakers effectively conveying their discoveries to prevent misunderstandings and confusion. The book also explored avenues for gathering biomedical policy information, discussed approaches to educate consumers, and presented strategies for enhancing communication in the realm of biomedicine.

=== The definition and advancement of civic scientific literacy ===
Miller's work has focused on quantifying and examining civic scientific literacy (CSL) in the United States and other advanced societies over the past 40 years. Drawing upon Benjamin Shen's conceptual groundwork, he developed metrics to assess civic scientific literacy. His work in this area is widely cited.

Miller's work has illustrated that approximately one in three citizens in the 20th and 21st centuries finds it possible to comprehend and effectively engage with a small number of public policy issues. Drawing on Gabriel Almond's groundwork in foreign policy, he broadened the application of the concept of issue salience and specialization to the realm of science and technology policy. In doing so, he introduced a framework for defining and assessing the informed and engaged segment of the population with regard to science and technology policy matters. He further argued that while it's impractical to make every citizen scientifically literate, it's crucial for those who are involved in science and technology policy to possess scientific literacy.

=== A reconceptualization of STEMM ===
In his early research, Miller and his team conducted the Longitudinal Study of American Youth (LSAY), tracking 4,100 students from 7th and 10th grades in 1987 until ages 45–48 in 2020, contributing to understanding the U.S. scientific and technological workforce. In collaboration with Camilla Benbow, he broadened the scope of STEM to encompass medicine and its allied scientific disciplines, introducing the term STEMM. Recognizing that science and medicine are becoming more intertwined, he and Benbow documented that many high school students initially aspire to be doctors but opt for careers as biological or biochemistry scientists during their college years.

=== The just-in-time information acquisition system ===
Over the past twenty years, Miller and his research group have concentrated their efforts on the rise of just-in-time information acquisition systems within the fields of health and science. The fundamental assertion made by his team is that the dominance of print and broadcast systems, which inherently operate in a single direction, is reaching its conclusion. In current landscape, individuals increasingly seek information on topics that matter to them from sources they trust when they need or want that information. This transition is facilitated by the growth of the Internet and the widespread availability of smartphones and smaller computing devices.

Miller and his colleagues have conducted studies on the rise of on-demand information gathering in fields such as health, science, space, and infectious diseases like influenza and Covid. They have predicted that just-in-time information retrieval systems will dominate the 21st century, with artificial intelligence systems playing a pivotal role in expanding and improving this method of information access and communication.

=== Two legacy datasets for secondary analysis ===
Miller's work is characterized by recurring themes that are encapsulated in two datasets, which are available for secondary analysis through the Inter-university Consortium for Political and Social Research (ICPSR). The 33-year longitudinal study, now referred to as the Longitudinal Study of American Life (LSAY-LSAL), conducted active data collection in its final decade with support from the National Science Foundation, the National Institute on Aging, and NASA.

A second time-series dataset comprises national cross-sectional data for the United States from 1957 to 2020. The initial 1957 dataset was commissioned by the National Association of Science Writers. It was conducted in the summer of 1957 by the Survey Research Center at the University of Michigan. Notably, this study took place just two months before the Soviet Union's launch of Sputnik and represents the sole national U.S. dataset related to science that predates this event. Over several decades, Miller undertook efforts to replicate and expand upon this research, ultimately concluding in 2020.

=== World Values Survey ===
Miller contributed to the World Values Survey, which was initiated in 1980 by Ronald Inglehart. The survey examines human values and related behaviors, conducting surveys every five years in over 90 countries. He and Inglehart led the seventh U.S. wave, which took place in 2016–17. Since 2021, he is the chair of the scientific advisory committee of the World Values Survey Association.

== Personal life ==
Miller married Betty (Liz) Dauw in 1973. They have two children: Jon Matthew (born 1975) and Katherine J. (born 1978). Jon Matthew is the Douglas Richstone Collegiate Professor of Astronomy at the University of Michigan. Katherine is the Vice President for Intellectual Property and Legal for Outpace Bio.

== Awards and honors ==
- 1963–69 – Fellow, Danforth Foundation
- 1964–65 – Fellow, National Opinion Research Center
- 1990-1, 1993–4, 1996–7 – president, International Council for the Comparative Study of the Public Understanding of Science and Technology
- 2003–present – Fellow, American Association for the Advancement of Science
- 2021–2026 – chair, scientific advisory committee, World Values Survey Association

== Bibliography ==
=== Books ===
- Citizenship in an Age of Science: Changing Attitudes Among Young Adults (1980) ISBN 9780080246628
- The American People and Science Policy: The Role of Public Attitudes in the Policy Process (1983) ISBN 9780080280646
- Public Perceptions of Science and Technology: A Comparative Study of the European Union, the United States, Japan, and Canada (1997) ISBN 9788488562852
- Biomedical Communication: Purposes, Audiences, and Strategies. (2001) ISBN 9780124967519
