= Ecphantus the Pythagorean =

Ancient Greek astronomer, philosopher and mathematician

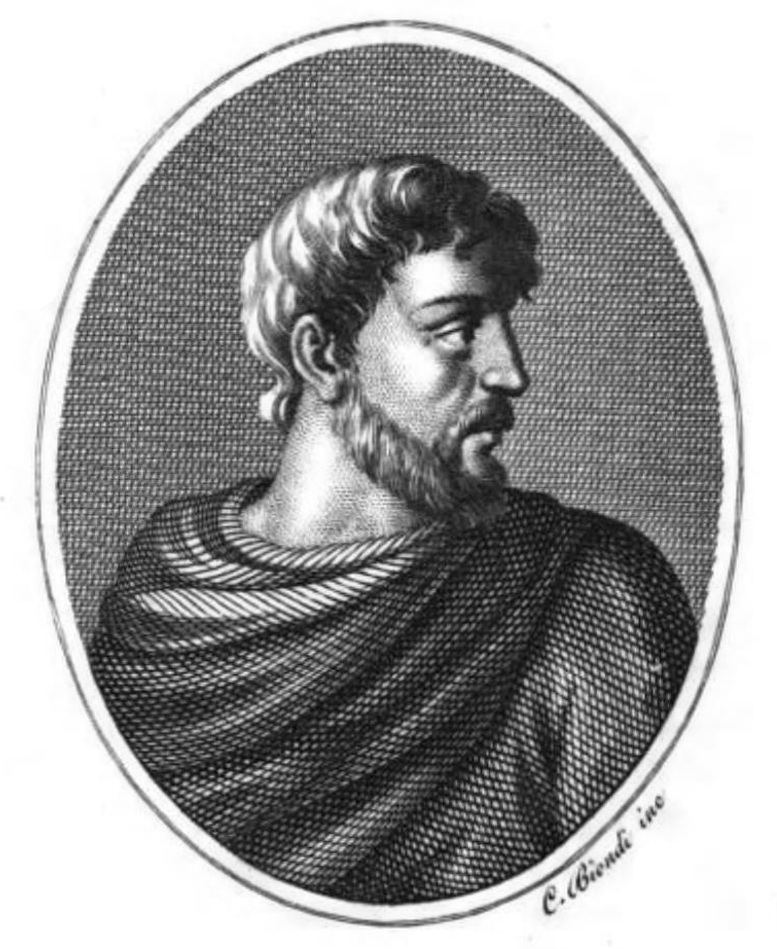
- Born: Syracuse, Ancient Greece
- Died: c. 4th-century BCE

Philosophical work
- Era: Ancient Greek philosophy
- School: Pythagoreanism
- Notable ideas: heliocentric theory

Ecphantus or Ecphantos (Ancient Greek: Ἔκφαντος) or Ephantus (Έφαντος) was an Ancient Greek pre-Socratic philosopher. He is identified as a Pythagorean of the 4th century BC from Syracuse, Magna Graecia, but the details concerning his life are historically obscure; he may have not been a historical person, but rather a fictional character invented by Heraclides of Pontus for use in his philosophical dialogues. He also may have been the same figure as the attested Ecphantus of Croton. Ecphantus was also of Syracuse. He developed a theory about constellations moving.

According to Eusebius, Ecphantus, like Heraclides of Pontus, was a supporter of the heliocentric theory: he believed that the Earth turns around its centre from west to towards east, like a wheel, as if it has an axis, the state. Ecphantus also maintained that there is only one Cosmos (Universe) governed by providence (πρόνοια).
